= Matthias Sannemüller =

German violist (born 1951)

Matthias Sannemüller (born 2 September 1951) is a German violist.

== Life ==
Born in Leipzig, Sannemüller was born in 1951 as son of the concertmaster Horst Sannemüller and the opera singer Philine Fischer. In his youth he learned piano and violin from Klaus Hertel. From 1966 he attended the Musikgymnasium Schloss Belvedere. From 1969 to 1974 he studied violin with Dieter Hasch at the Hochschule für Musik Franz Liszt, Weimar and viola with Dietmar Hallmann at the University of Music and Theatre Leipzig. Until 1975 he was aspirant at the University of Music and Theatre Leipzig. Besides his studies he attended music seminars in Pécs, Brno and Weimar.

He received his first employment in 1976 with the Gewandhausorchester Leipzig. One year later he was awarded a prize at the International Instrumental Competition Markneukirchen. Since 1977 he has been solo violist at today MDR Leipzig Radio Symphony Orchestra. From 1978 to 1992 he was a member of the Gruppe Neue Musik Hanns Eisler. Concert tours took him to Asia, through Europe and the USA. Numerous premieres have been recorded on radio with the Leipziger Consort. He was appointed chamber musician in 1983 and chamber virtuoso in 1988. In 1988 he was appointed by the World Philharmonic Orchestra in Montreal. Four years later he founded the Ensemble Sortisatio, which is dedicated to Neue Musik.

Sannemüller is a connoisseur of Baroque music through his membership in various chamber orchestras, such as the Saxon Baroque Orchestra Leipzig and his playing on the baroque Scale length. The result is a CD recording of the Concerto for viola in G major by Georg Philipp Telemann, a reproduction of the Concerti with viola d'amore by Christoph Graupner, and the world's first recording of the reconstructed Viola Concerto in E flat major by Johann Sebastian Bach.

== Prizes and awards ==
As a member of the group "Neue Musik Hanns Eisler" Sannemmüller received the following awards:

- 1980: Art Prize of the German Democratic Republic
- 1986: Kunstpreis der Stadt Leipzig
- 1988: Baddge of honour of the Verband der Komponisten und Musikwissenschaftler der DDR in Gold
- 1989: Interpretation Prize of the MaerzMusik
- 1991: Schneider-Schott Music Prize Mainz

== Discography ==
- 1996: Neue Musik für Oboe (Edel Classics)
- 1999: Thomas Buchholz: Eruption
- 1999: Thomas Müller: Kraino – Ich verwirkliche (ConBrio Verlag)
- 2000: Viola da gamba concertata (Raumklang Records)
- 2006: Johannes Brahms: Chorwerke (Edel Classics)
- 2010: Norbert Burgmüller: Lieder und Kammermusik (Querstand)
- 2010: Thomas Buchholz: UNDEUTschLICHt – zyklen für ensembles (Kreuzberg Records)

The following recordings were made with the Ensemble Sortisatio:

- 2003: Groupe Lacroix: 8 Pieces on Paul Klee (Creative Works Records)
- 2004: Ensemble Sortisatio (Querstand)
- 2009: Jean-Luc Darbellay: A Portrait (Claves Records)

== Publications ==
As an editor he published the following work:

- 2008: Karl Ottomar Treibmann: Tonspiele für Viola (Friedrich Hofmeister Musikverlag)

== Literature ==
- Burkhard Glaetzner, Reiner Kontressowitz (ed.): Gruppe Neue Musik "Hanns Eisler" 1970–1990. Spiel-Horizonte. Leipzig 1990, p. 54.
- Hans-Rainer Jung, Claudius Böhm: Das Gewandhaus-Orchester. Seine Mitglieder und seine Geschichte seit 1743.. Faber & Faber, Leipzig 2006, ISBN 978-3-936618-86-0, p. 288.
- Christoph Sramek (ed.): Die Töne haben mich geblendet. Festschrift zum 60. Geburtstag des Dresdner Komponisten Jörg Herchet. Klaus-Jürgen Kamprad publishing house. Altenburg 2003, ISBN 978-3-930550-28-9, p. 344.
