= Walter Klingner =

German oboist and english horn player

Walter Klingner (born 1961) is a German oboist and cor anglais player.

== Life ==
Born in Gotha, Klingner studied oboe with Axel Schmidt at the Hochschule für Musik Franz Liszt, Weimar. He now works there as a lecturer.

Since 1986, he is Solo Englisch hornist at the MDR Leipzig Radio Symphony Orchestra. He is also a guest performer at the Gewandhausorchester Leipzig, the Bachorchester Stuttgart, the Berliner Philharmonie and the Bayreuth Festival orchestra.

Numerous compositions have been premiered by him, among others by Gerd Domhardt. He recorded compositions by Felix Draeseke, Carlo Yvon and Elliott Carter with Frank Peter. Klingner is a member of the Kammersymphonie Leipzig and of the Ensemble Sortisatio.

== Recordings ==
- 1991: Sächsisches Kammerorchester Leipzig
- 1995: Gubener Kirchenmusik I with Wieland Meinhold, organ (Coolmusic)
- 1999: Thomas Müller: Kraino – Ich verwirkliche (ConBrio Verlag)
- 2003: Groupe Lacroix: 8 Pieces on Paul Klee (Creative Works Records)
- 2004: Ensemble Sortisatio (Querstand)
- 2005: Ernst Krenek: Zeitlieder (Eos Record Label)
- 2009: Jean-Luc Darbellay: A Portrait (Claves Records)
- 2011: Thomas Buchholz: Ehre sei Gott für alles (Querstand)
