= Michael Schneider (composer) =

German composer and musicologist (born 1964)

Michael Schneider (born 6 September 1964) is a Swiss composer and musicologist. He is active as a music and culture journalist as well as manager.

== Life ==
Schneider was born in Göttingen in 1964 and received piano and harpsichord lessons at an early age. He took his school-leaving examination at the Alte Kantonsschule Aarau, where the composer János Tamás also taught. From 1985 to 1993 he studied musicology, modern history and art history at the University of Zurich and from 1990 to 1994 composition with Dimitri Terzakis at the University of the Arts Bern. In 1988/89 he lived in Sydney, where he made contacts with the Australian music scene. As part of the Lucerne Festival Schneider attended master classes with Edison Denisov in 1991 and 1993. In 1993 he was a founding member of the group of composers Groupe Lacroix.

Schneider worked from 1984 to 1993 as music critic for the Aargauer Zeitung and the Badener Tagblatt. From 1993 to 1998 he was project manager at Stapferhaus, managed the PAN Musikverlag in Zurich from 1999 to 2001 and subsequently headed the public relations department of the Museum der Kulturen Basel from 2001 to 2006. From 2000 to 2012 he was also artistic director of the Wettinger Kammerkonzerte in Baden AG.

From 2006 to 2019, Schneider served as managing director of the Swiss Cultural Foundation Künstlerhaus Boswil. In addition, he is active on a voluntary basis in several cultural foundations (e.g. since 1990 he has been a member of the board of trustees of the Peter Mieg Foundation).

== Work ==
=== Orchestral works ===
- Von einer Wanderung (Werner Wehrli) (1992/95) for chamber orchestra
- Laufen auf dünnem Eis (1992/96) for orchestra
- Rubin (2001) for string orchestra

=== Piano pieces ===
- La beauté retrouvée (1991) for piano four hands
- Desii e terre nuove (1995) for two pianos
- Mandorla (1998) for piano
- Fussball (2008). 4 studies for piano solo

=== Chamber music ===
- Evocation (1991) for violin, clarinet and piano
- Licht über Schatten (1993) for two flutes
- Über verwunschenen Ebenen (1994/95) for chamber ensemble
- Kailash (1996) for horn and piano
- touch(e)! (1996) for piano trio. First performance 7 December 1996 Moscow (Moscow Rachmaninov Trio)
- Schubert überquert die Donau bei Wien (1997) for string trio
- 67 pas sur la nappe de l'étang glacé (1997) for oboe and a frozen lake (playback tape)
- Shark Turtle Ray (1998/99) for oboe, viola and guitar Premiere June 28, 1999 (8th MDR Musiksommer, Museum der bildenden Künste, Ensemble Sortisatio)
- Distant calls (1999/2000) for saxophone quartet and piano
- Voiles (2000). 3 sketches for 3 oboes
- Es werde Licht (2000) for viola solo
- Mandorla (1998/2001) for soprano saxophone solo
- Painting/Orange (2007) for organ and saxophone
- Die chemischen Elemente (2008) for flute, saxophone and vibraphone
- Järvi (2009) for violoncello solo
- Fanfare for Sandringham (1991/2010) for trumpet and trombone
- Gran Partita (2011) for wind septet

=== Stage music ===
- Der Mann im Mond (1991/92). Expressionist drama after Georg Britting for 3 speaking roles, oboe, saxophone, violin, cello and percussion (1st player). First performance 27 November 1992 Berne (ad hoc ensemble of the Junge Bühne Zurich and the Conservatory of Berne, conductor: Jean-Luc Darbellay)
- Im innersten Winter (requiem) (1999) for speaker, bass clarinet and guitar after texts by Andreas Neeser. First performance 21 November 1999 Lenzburg (Michael Wolf [narrator], Thomas Hunziker [bass clarinet], Martin Pirktl [guitar])
- Geträumt hab ich jede Nacht von dir (2003). Chamber opera (fragment). Libretto: Andreas Neeser. For four voices (S.A.T.B), Kammerchor, Live-Elektronik und Kammerensemble (Bassetthorn, Englischhorn, Percussion [1st Spieler], Viola, Violoncello)
- A Dictionary of Maladies (2002–2005). Chamber opera (Libretto: Jen Craig. For two low voices (bass/bass baritone) and chamber ensemble (clarinet/bass clarinet, alto/baritone saxophone, bassoon/contrabassoon, electric guitar, percussion [2nd player], violoncello, double bass). First performance (concertante) 26 August 2005 Lenzburg

=== Vocal and choral music ===
- Colors and Countenance (1996/97) for soprano and wind quintet. Lyrics: Ralph Waldo Emerson, Emily Dickinson
- Gorillas are sleeping at night (1997) for soprano, alto, mixed choir (SATB) and piano four hands with small percussion. text: Scientific language
- Licht bei Vermeer (1997/98) for eight-part choir (SSAATTBB), basset horn and vibraphone. text: Vincent van Gogh, Pieter Teding van Berkhout, Dirk Hannema, Catharina Bolnes, everyday language
- Strasbourg configuration (1998) for voice and piano. Lyrics: Hans Arp
- Alle Schatten der Blätter (1998). 5 madrigals for soprano solo. Lyrics: Ulrich Suter
- I giganti nell'autosilo (1999) for choir a cappella (high voices). Lyrics: Franz Hohler
- Inlaid (1998/2000). 4 miniatures for soprano and piano after lyrics by Ulrich Suter
- Gand (2005) for baritone solo
- Ballad (Dällebach Kari) (2011) for vocal quartet (SATB). Lyrics: Mani Matter
- Chue am Waldrand (2011) for vocal quartet (SATB). Lyrics: Mani Matter

== Discography ==
- 1997: Groupe Lacroix: The Composer Group (Creative Works Records) with the Moscow Rachmaninov Trio
- 2001: Distant Calls (TonArt) with Saxism – das Saxophon Quartett
- 2001: Capricci Musicali (MM) with Thomas Hlawatsch (piano)
- 2003: Groupe Lacroix: 8 Pieces on Paul Klee (Creative Works Records) with the Ensemble Sortisatio

== Publications ==
- (Edited with Kristina Ericson:) Ein unstillbares Sehnen. Werner Wehrli. Das dichterische Schaffen. Sauerländer Verlag, Aarau 1994, ISBN 3-7941-3847-3.
- Verborgene Spuren. Anne Frank und die Schweiz. In Stapferhaus Lenzburg (ed.): Anne Frank und wir. Chronos Verlag, Zürich 1995, ISBN 3-905311-71-2.
- Der Komponist Peter Mieg : Leben, Werk, Rezeption. Amadeus Verlag, Winterthur 1995, ISBN 3-905049-64-3.
- Das unbeschreibliche Licht und die winterlichen Schatten. Zum musikalischen Denken von János Tamás. In Förderverein János Támas (ed.): Feuerbilder – Schattenklänge – János Tamás. Komponist, Dirigent, Pädagoge. Müller & Schade, Bern 1997, ISBN 3-9520878-0-7.
- We can work it out. Die Beat-Szene in der Schweiz (1964–67). In Stapferhaus Lenzburg (ed.): A walk on the wild side. Jugendszenen der Schweiz von den 30er Jahren bis heute. Chronos Verlag, Zürich 1997, ISBN 3-905312-03-4.
- (Edited with Gaby Fierz:) Feste im Licht. Religiöse Vielfalt in einer Stadt. Christoph Merian Verlag, Basel 2004, ISBN 3-85616-234-8.
- Schneider also wrote the biographical articles on Friedrich Theodor Fröhlich, Walther Geiser and Peter Mieg for the music encyclopaedia Die Musik in Geschichte und Gegenwart and on Peter Mieg for the Historisches Lexikon der Schweiz as well as specialist essays for the Schweizer Musikzeitung – Schweizer Musikpädagogische Blätter.
