= Christian Henking =

Swiss composer and choir director

Christian Henking (born 14 January 1961) is a Swiss composer, conductor and choir leader.

== Life ==
Henking was born in Basel in 1961. He graduated from the Freies Gymnasium Bern in 1981. From 1981 to 1989 he studied music theory with Theo Hirsbrunner at the University of the Arts Bern. In addition he was trained by Ewald Körner to become Kapellmeister. From 1987 he took composition lessons with Cristóbal Halffter, Dimitri Terzakis and Edisson Denissow. He also attended master classes with Wolfgang Rihm and Heinz Holliger. He received further impulses from György Kurtág.

Henking conducted the Bern Amadeus Chor and from 1998 to 2007 the Vokalkollegium Bern. In 2010 he founded the Ensemble Proton Bern, of which he became artistic adviser. He is also a lecturer in musical composition and music theory at the University of the Arts Bern. Henking was one of the founding members of the Groupe Lacroix. The majority of his compositions are published by Müller & Schade in Bern.

== Awards ==
- 2000: Culture Prize of the Bürgi-Willert Foundation, Bern. (bestowed by Heinz Holliger)
- 2002: Recognition Prize for Music of the Canton of Bern.
- 2016: Music Prize of the Canton of Bern.

== Work ==
=== Orchestral music ===
- Brest (1990) for 2 violoncellos and string orchestra
- piece for 19 cellos (1991)
- Wie Tau, im Lichte siebenfach gebrochen (1995) for 12 flutes
- Paragraph (1998) for orchestra
- Concert (2003) for violin and string orchestra
- Piazza / Spazio (2004) for orchestra

=== Chamber music ===
- *** (1984) for piano solo
- 9 Fragmente (1985) for viola and piano
- Klavierstück (1988)
- Créaction (1988) for flute, clarinet, bassoon (also co-fage), piano, violin, violoncello and percussion
- piano quartet (1989)
- Small piece for violin and accordion (1991)
- 4 Bagatelles (1992) for clarinet trio
- Sillis (1992) for guitar solo
- Prosím (1992) for violin and bass clarinet
- Lirpa (1993) for piano solo
- 5 Bagatelles (1993) for piano solo
- Please rise (1994) for piano trio
- Concerto for bass trombone and brass band (1994)
- Kalymnos (1994) for tenor saxophone and accordion
- Metavirulent (1995) for violin and piano
- Quartet (1995) for flute, viola, violoncello and piano
- Je voudrais faire votre portrait (1995) for piano quartet
- Joëlle (1996) for flute and organ
- Merle blanc (1996) for string octet
- Viento (1996) for flute solo
- Song for M.A.K. (1996) for 4 bamboo flutes and 4 glasses
- 7 Bagatelles (1996) for piano solo
- Novalis 24 (1996) for piano trio
- Stück (Piece) for 5 violas, or 5 cellos (1989–1997)
- Dublin (1997) for percussion
- 6 Bagatelles (1997) for piano solo
- Six pieces for Edison (1997) for violin and violoncello
- Buyuma Place (1997) for string quartet
- Die Geschichte vom Pelikan und Pavian (1997) for violin and piano
- Karimata (1998) for string quartet
- Colline des forêts argentines (1998) for violin, violoncello and piano four hands
- Insigne (1998) for violoncello solo
- Toro (1998) for violoncello and piano
- Yemanjá (1999) for one percussionist
- 3 Bagatelles for 3 English horns (1999)
- Deruda (1999) for clarinet, violin and piano
- Reservoir (2000) for clarinet and piano
- Ode to Mr Muheim (2000) for 2 flutes
- Lotus (2002) for flute solo
- Amplitudes (2002) for violin solo
- Assedo (2003) for flute and piano
- To my lips come the scents to the potions (2005) for 4 percussions
- Chi (2005) for shakuhachi and violin
- "Dört unte-n-i der Tiefi" (2007) for flute and violoncello
- Scènes d'enfants (2007) for piano solo
- "Und blaue Funken brennen" (2007) for piano trio
- Diapason (2008) for violin solo
- Helian (2009) for double bass solo
- Turn around (2009) for 2 pianos
- Intermission (2010) for 2 pianos
- In weit Ferne (2011) for violin, violoncello and piano
- Four Moments (2014) for guitar and violoncello. Composed for the Duo En Cuerdas.

=== Stage music ===
- Stück für Klarinette und Pantomime (1988)
- Leonce und Lena (1999–2001). Opera in 3 acts. Libretto by Christian Henking after Georg Büchner
- Bon appétit (2005). A musical theatre for 4 people
- "Dash" (2007). Small scene for soprano and clarinet

=== Choral music ===
- Cotton Gloves (1995) for six-part choir. text: W. H. Auden
- und sehe dich tanzen Gebete des Friedens (1996). Cantata for soprano, alto, four-part choir, percussion and string quintet
- Schatten (1997) for 4-part choir, 2 violins, 2 cellos and double bass. text: Wolfgang Musculus
- Palindrome and Nonsense (1997) for soprano, alto, four-part choir, male narrative (from choir) and 2 pianos. text: Christian Henking
- Dromedar (1998) for four-part choir. text: Christian Henking
- Ich bin so müde von Seufzen (2001) for 8-part mixed choir
- Requiem (2001) for choir, 2 flutes, percussion and strings
- Fragment (2003) for baritone, four-part choir, organ and double bass

=== Vocal music ===
- Ottos Mops (1989) für 9 Stimmen. Text Ernst Jandl
- Zitate (1990) für 7 Stimmen (frei wählbar) und Orchester. Text Alltags-, Werbe- und Mediensprache
- Slogans (1991) für Sopran, Flöte, Oboe, Horn und Kontrabass. Text Werbesprache
- Zig (1992) für Sopran und Vibraphon
- Schattige Gärten / Von Blutbuchenblättern (1990–1993) für Bariton und Klavier. Text Friederike Roth
- und ich stolpere mich näher zu Dir (1996). Liederzyklus für Mezzosopran und Klavier. Text Bettina Kaelin
- Die Geschichte vom Pelikan und Pavian (1996) für Violine, Klavier und Sprecher
- Nero (1997) für Sopran und Streichtrio. Text Franz Schubert
- Sahara (1997) für singende Pianistin oder singenden Pianisten oder klavierspielende Sängerin oder klavierspielenden Sänger
- Leb wohl, du schöner Zedernwald (1997) für Alt, Flöte, Klarinette, Klavier, Violine und Violoncello. Text Adolf Wölfli
- „Unbescholtenheit und Ordnung“ (1999) für Mezzosopran, 2 Tenöre, Bariton, Bassbariton und Klavier. Text William Shakespeare
- TIK (1999) für Sopran, Mezzosopran, Flöte, Oboe, Klarinette, Streichquartett und Klavier. Text Daniil Charms, Dan Wiener
- Hommage à -tt- (2001) für Sopran, Klarinette, Violoncello und Klavier. Text: Martin Etter
- Die Liebe des Dichters (2002). Lied für Bariton und Klavier. Text Robert Schumann
- Maifeuer (2003) für Sopran, Flöte und Klavier. Text Rose Ausländer
- „Zeit zwischen meinen Rippen“ (2003). Ein kleiner Liederzyklus für Alt/Mezzosopran und Klavier. Text Astrid Scholtz
- Was ist es also? (2005) für (Mezzo)Sopran und Klavier. Text Erich Fried
- Ein Vogelort schwarz (2006) für Bariton und Klavier. Text Nora Schmidt
- Weil auf mir (2006) für Bariton und Klavier. Text Nikolaus Lenau
- Empreinte (2008) für Trio Basso und Sprecherin. Text Joël-Claude Meffre
- La voix, au loin (2008) für Trio Basso und Sprecherin. Text Joël-Claude Meffre
- In eines Spiegels Bläue (2009) für Mezzosopran und Klavier. Text Georg Trakl
- ein reigen (2011). Liederzyklus für Tenor und Klavier. Text Raphael Urweider
- Keine Zeit ist zeitig mit der Sehnsucht Zeit (2011) für Mezzosopran, Bariton, Flöte, Lupophon, Kontraforte, Violine, Violoncello, Harfe und Klavier. Text Robert Walser

== Discography ==
- Werkauswahl 1993–1997. U.a. Amadeus Chor Bern (M&S Music, 1997)
- Moscow Rachmaninov Trio: Novalis 24 für Klaviertrio. In Groupe Lacroix: The Composer Group (Creative Works Records, 1997)
- Thomas Blumenthal (Ensemble Sortisatio): Sillis für Gitarre solo. In Groupe Lacroix: 8 Pieces on Paul Klee (Creative Works Records, 2003)
- Esther Flückiger: 5 Bagatellen für Klavier. In Festival L'art pour L'Aar. Die Konzerte 2006/2007 (Pentaphon, 2007)
- Capella Nova: Ich bin ein schwebendes Luftblatt für 16-stimmigen Chor und Harfe. In BAP NOS (Guild, 2010)
- Ensemble Proton Bern: Keine Zeit ist zeitig mit der Sehnsucht Zeit” für Mezzosopran, Bariton, Flöte, Lupophon, Kontraforte, Violine, Violoncello, Harfe und Klavier. In Grammont Selection 5 (Musiques Suisses 2012)

== Literature ==
- Christian Henking. In Hans Steinbeck, Walter Labhart (Hrsg.): Schweizer Komponisten unserer Zeit. Biographien, Werkverzeichnisse mit Discographie und Bibliographie. Amadeus, Winterthur 1993, ISBN 3-905049-05-8, pp. 174–175.
- Theo Hirsbrunner: Tendenziell, nicht starr – der Komponist Christian Henking. In Dissonanz 55 (1998), pp. 4–9.
- Henking, Christian. In Peter Hollfelder: Klaviermusik. Internationales chronologisches Lexikon. Geschichte. Komponisten. Werke. Supplement, Noetzel, Wilhelmshaven 2005, ISBN 3-7959-0855-8, p. 99.
- Henking, Christian. In Axel Schniederjürgen (ed.): Kürschners Musiker-Handbuch. 5. Auflage, Saur Verlag, Munich 2006, ISBN 3-598-24212-3, p. 178.
