= 8 Pieces on Paul Klee =

German music album

8 Pieces on Paul Klee is the debut album of the Ensemble Sortisatio. It was recorded in February and March 2002 in Leipzig, Germany and in August 2002 in Lucerne, Switzerland. It was released in 2003 by Creative Works Records.

== Background ==
All compositions on the CD 8 Pieces on Paul Klee, with the exception of Christian Henking's Sillis, were commissioned by the Mitteldeutscher Rundfunk.

The Groupe Lacroix were the composers and consists of well-known Swiss and Austrian composers of the contemporary music scene. Its members attended master classes with the renowned Russian composer Edison Denisov as part of the Lucerne Festival. The group was born at the Centre musical de la Fondation Hindemith Chalet de Lacroix, the last residence of Paul Hindemith in Blonay.

In addition to the chairman of the Swiss section of the International Society for Contemporary Music, Jean-Luc Darbellay, the internationally successful musicians John Wolf Brennan and Marianne Schroeder count themselves among its members. Also the composers Christian Henking, Michael Schneider, Michael Radanovics and Alfons Karl Zwicker play on the recording.

Except for Henking's Sillis (DSE), the compositions were premiered in 1999 during the MDR Musiksommer at the Museum der bildenden Künste in Leipzig and in 2002 at the Hindemith-Musikzentrum in Blonay.

== The music ==
The following creations were inspired by the Swiss painter Paul Klee and his paintings:

- Besessenes Mädchen

Composer Thuring Bräm concerned himself with Klee's portrait painting. Klee painted both positive and negative faces and he was particularly interested in feminine figures. Demonic Lady (1937) and the subject of this composition, Besessenes Mädchen (1924), are examples of a sad or somber character in Klee's work. Bräm became familiar with Besessenes Mädchen at the Beyeler Foundation in Basel in 2000 and had thought out the entire quartet by 2001.

- Shark Turtle Ray

During a stay in Sydney between 1998 and 1999, Michael Schneider was overwhelmed by a creative urge. He composed these three pictorial movements inspired by sharks, turtles, and rays. The piece is scored for oboe, viola and guitar.

- Wie der Klee vierblättrig wurde

In 1999, Marianne Schroeder was influenced by Klee's watercolors, Hat Kopf, Hand, Fuss und Herz (1930) and Mr. Z (1934). The movements are played one after another, and the instruments act interchangeably. The title translates to "How the clover became four-leaved." It is a pun on Klee's name, which means "clover."

- N-gl

John Wolf Brennan references Klee's Angelus Novus (1920). The short expression N-gl (1999) is a reference to three instruments, without guitar.

- Sillis

Written in 1992, Sillis is the only work on the album that was not composed for the ensemble. It references one of Klee's most famous paintings, Hauptweg und Nebenwege (1929), created after the artist traveled through Egypt. Christian Henking composed the work for guitar.

- Trauernd

Trauernd refers to the painting of the same name from 1934, in which Klee reveals his deep distress over experiences after his release from Nazi imprisonment. Alfons Karl Zwicker composed this piece in 2002 for the entire ensemble.

- Entweihte Sphinx, Die Sphinx geht

Michael Radanovics interpreted the sketches Entweihte Sphinx (1939) and Die Sphinx geht (1939). Klee became mystical as his art matured. Radanovics tried to capture this mood in 1999.

- Sozusagen

In 17 miniatures, this piece traces the dots and strokes of Klee's Sozusagen (1933), painted after his exile to Switzerland. It is Jean-Luc Darbellay's last composition, written in 1997. It has a motivating and forward-looking effect.

== Success ==
The works on the CD have been performed on several tours in numerous cities in Switzerland. The ensemble has given concerts in Bern, Lucerne, Lausanne and Winterthur. In 2004, the works were broadcast at the Dutch Concertzender. In 2008 there were performances with Alexander Klee, Paul Klee's grandson. In addition, other composers felt inspired to compose on the subject of Klee. The Ensemble Sortisatio was invited to the People's Republic of China and is looking forward to further cooperation with international composers.

== Reception ==
A pleasure without quotation marks.

— Maria Künzli, Berner Zeitung

And Matthias Sannemüller, viola, Walter Klingner, oboe, Axel Andrae, bassoon and guitarist Thomas Blumenthal interpreted this distinctive sound show with unparalleled mastery, exquisite sensitivity and perfect interplay.

— Rita Wolfensberger, Der Landbote

In the first of the eight pieces [...] a special quality [...] was immediately apparent [...], resulting from the exclusive cast of the Ensemble Sortisatio Leipzig.

— Jürg Huber, Neue Zürcher Zeitung

== Cover ==
On the cover are Klee pictures of school children from Weggis.

== Track list ==
1. Besessenes Mädchen (ein musikalisches Skizzenblatt für Paul Klee) – 5:15
2. Shark Turtle Ray – 7:00
3. Wie der Klee vierblättrig wurde – 6:49
4. N-gl – 11:13
5. Sillis – 5:46
6. Trauernd – 6:51
7. Entweihte Sphinx, Die Sphinx geht – 7:25
8. Sozusagen – 9:25

All compositions are by the Groupe Lacroix, except title [1], which was written by the guest composer Thüring Bräm.
