= Alfons Karl Zwicker =

Swiss composer and pianist

Alfons Karl Zwicker (born 22 April 1952) is a Swiss composer, pianist and painter.

== Life ==
Born in St. Gallen, Zwicker began as a painter and designer. He created several paintings, which were exhibited between 1973 and 1980. Zwicker then studied piano from 1976 to 1981 with Hadassa Schwimmer at Zurich University of the Arts and from 1983 to 1987 with Werner Bärtschi in Zurich. From 1984 to 1988 he studied musical composition with Rudolf Kelterborn at the City of Basel Music Academy.

Afterwards he first appeared as a Neue Musik interpreter and was active as a song accompanist. In 1987 he founded the International Society for Contemporary Music music podium Contrapunkt in St. Gallen to promote contemporary music. He conducted this concert series until 1993.

From 1990 he was active as a composer and in 1993 he attended a master class in Lucerne with the Russian composer Edison Denisov. He then became a member of the composer group Groupe Lacroix in 2000. With them he realized a music project for Paul Klee. In the context of the project Œuvres Suisses he composed for the Sinfonieorchester St. Gallen the work «Unter dem Grabhügel» ("Under the Grave Mound") for saxophone and orchestra, which was performed with the soloist Vincent Daoud (saxophone) under the direction of Otto Tausk was premiered on 20 February 2015 in the Tonhalle St. Gallen.

He completed a postgraduate course in Arts Management at the University of Basel in 2002 with a Master of Advanced Studies.

== Awards ==
- 1989: Kulturförderungspreis der Stadt St. Gallen (for contribution to the music podium Contrapunkt)
- 1991: Internationaler Bodenseekulturförderungspreis (for compositional work)
- 1993: Werkbeitrag des Kantonalen Amts für Kulturpflege St. Gallen (for project Afrikanische Notizen)
- 1994: Werkbeitrag der Stiftung Pro Helvetia (for the Orchestra-cyclus Vom Klang der Bilder)
- 1997: Werkbeitrag der Stiftung Pro Arte (for the Opera Die Höllenmaschine)
- 2003: Kompositionsbeitrag Stiftung Pro Helvetia (for the Opera Der Tod und das Mädchen)
- 2004: Förderbeitrag der Ernst von Siemens Musikstiftung (for the Opera Der Tod und das Mädchen)
- 2007: Werkbeitrag der Stadt St. Gallen (for Ein weltliches Requiem)
- 2012: Kulturpreis der Stadt St. Gallen – endowed with CHF 20,000 (for experimental music theatre and impressive stage productions)

== Works ==
=== Stage music ===
==== Operas ====
- Die Höllenmaschine. Opera in four acts after Jean Cocteau. premiere 1998 Theater St. Gallen
- Eine Scheidelinie wird weiter herausgezogen. Oper in einem Akt nach der szenischen Dichtung von Nelly Sachs. (Premiere) 2001 Theater St. Gallen
- Der Tod und das Mädchen. Opera in six scenes. Libretto: Daniel Fuchs after Ariel Dorfman's eponymous dramas. Premiere 4 December 2010 Festspielhaus Hellerau

==== Stage/acting music ====
- Nachtduett (1989-1990). Cycle with poems by Georg Trakl for mezzo-soprano, bass, flute, harpsichord, 4 violins, viola, violoncello and double bass.

=== Vocal music ===
- Erfrorene Träume (1990–1992). Cycle after poems by Josef Kopf for mezzo-soprano and ensemble
- Pilgerfahrt zu blauen Eisziegeln (1990–1993) for baritone and piano. Text: Josef Kopf
- Tropfen auf Stein (1995). cycle after poems by Elisabeth Heck for baritone, flute, harp, piano, percussion and viola
- Die Welt braust (1996) for baritone solo after a letter from August Stramm
- Konstellation mit Mondtransit (1998–1999) for soprano, violin, trombone, violoncello, clarinet and piano
- Erinnerung an Nelly Sachs (1999) for 2 flutes, cembalo and female voice
- Empathie (2001–2002) for soprano, violoncello and tape. Text: Else Lasker-Schüler
- Landschaft aus Schreien (2003) for mezzo-soprano and piano. Text: Nelly Sachs
- Mirlitonnades (2007) for mezzo-soprano and 6 instruments. Text: Samuel Beckett
- Dem heiligsten Stern über mir (2009) for alto and piano

=== Instrumental music ===
==== Orchestral music ====
- Begegnung mit dem Eis (1992–1993) for medium orchestra
- Vom Klang der Bilder (1987–1996). Cycle for large orchestra and piano solo
- Sprachklang (2004) für solistisches Streichorchester
- L’été symétrique (Le jardin sous les eaux, part 2) (2009–2010) for large orchestra

==== Chamber music ====
- Variationen für Violine solo (1988)
- Diskurs (1988) für Klavier und 2 Trommeln (1 Spieler)
- Rituale für Fada (1994) für Streichquartett
- Postludien (1995–1997) für Violine und Klavier
- Kosmogramm I (1998–1999) für Klavier solo
- Trauernd (2001). Klee-Klang für Oboe, Fagott, Viola und Gitarre
- Verständigung (2002). Erinnerungen aus dem Verlies für Ensemble
- Botschaften des Regens (2003) für Violoncello und Schlagzeug
- Monogramme (2004–2007). 8 Klavierstücke
- Secretum (2006–2007). 8 Stücke nach den Urzeichen des I Ching für Violoncello und Kontrabass
- Monstrosität (2009–2010) für Klavier zu 4 Händen
- Vom Klang der radikalen Architektur (2010). Zyklus für Klavier zu vier Händen
- Hommage à Jean Baudrillard (2010) for Ensemble

== Discography ==
- Vom Klang der Bilder (Musiques Suisses, 1998). Peter Waters (piano), Bohuslav Martinu Philharmonic Orchestra, Monica Buckland Hofstetter (conductor)
- Erfrorene Träume (ASM, 1999). Eleanor James, Marc Fournel, Charly Baur, Priska Zaug, Ursula Oelke, Manuel Bärtsch, Juhani Palola, Beatrix Sieber, Leo Gschwend, Jean-Marc Chappuis, Raffael Bietenhader, Jürg Wyttenbach (conductor)
- Rituale für Fada (Classic 2000). Arioso-Quartett St. Gallen
- Groupe Lacroix: 8 Pieces on Paul Klee (Creative Works Records, 2003). Ensemble Sortisatio
- Monogramme (Creative Works Records, 2008). Peter Waters (piano)
- Der Tod und das Mädchen (MGB, 2011). Frances Pappas (mezzo-soprano), Andreas Scheibner (baritone), Hans-Jürgen Schöpflin (tenor), Choir and Sinfonieorchester St. Gallen, Jonathan Stockhammer (conductor)

== Literature ==
- Adrian Riklin: Die Geburt der Musik aus dem alltäglichen Drama. In Saiten 44 (1997).
- Roland Schönenberg: Reise über Afrika ins Nordlicht. St. Gallen: Komponisten-Portrait Alfons Karl Zwicker. In Dissonanz 55 (1998), pp. 33–34.
- Zwicker, Alfons Karl. In Axel Schniederjürgen (ed.): Kürschners Musiker-Handbuch. 5th edition, Saur Verlag, Munich 2006, ISBN 3-598-24212-3, p. 537.
- Zwicker, Alfons Karl. In Wilhelm Kosch, Ingrid Bigler-Marschall (ed.): Deutsches Theater-Lexikon. Biographisches und bibliographisches Handbuch. VOl. 7: Wolbring–Zysset, De Gruyter, Berlin [among others] 2011, ISBN 978-3-11-026918-5, pp. 3926–3927.
- Lisa D. Nolte: Blutrote Betroffenheit. Alfons Karl Zwickers Oper Der Tod und das Mädchen am Theater St. Gallen (September bis November 2011). In Dissonanz 117 (2012), pp. 59–60.
