= Leipziger Consort =

The Leipziger Consort was a well-known chamber music ensemble from the DDR

== History ==
The Ensemble was founded in 1982. Members were on the one hand Axel Schmidt (oboe), Matthias Sannemüller (viola) and Dieter Zahn (double-bass). They were solo musicians in the Leipzig Radio Symphony Orchestra (today: MDR-Sinfonieorchester) and members of the Gruppe Neue Musik Hanns Eisler. In addition, Roland Zimmer (guitar) and later Thomas Blumenthal (guitar) were its members.

They dedicated themselves to Baroque music and New music. In particular they premiered works by Reiner Bredemeyer, Georg Katzer, Friedrich Schenker, Günter Neubert, Karl Ottomar Treibmann, Manfred Schubert und Thomas Müller. The Leipzig Consort gave guest concerts in many European countries; numerous radio productions were documented.

The group disbanded in the early 1990s. In 1992 Sannemüller and Blumenthal founded the Ensemble Sortisatio.

== Literature ==
- Manfred Vetter: Kammermusik in der DDR. Peter Lang, Frankfurt 1996, ISBN 3-631-30257-6, p. 194 ff.
