= Ensemble Sortisatio =

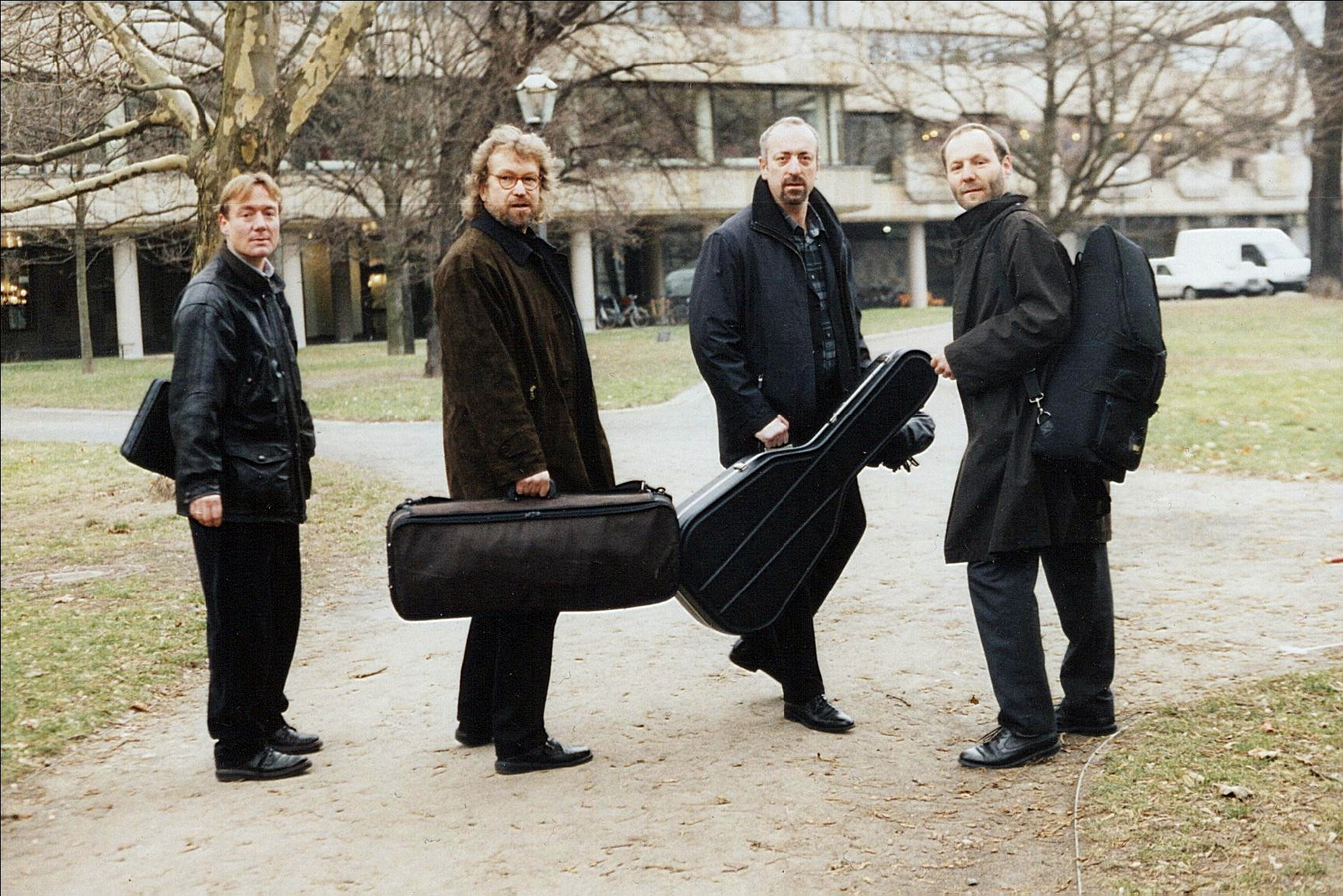

Background information
- Origin: Leipzig, Germany
- Genres: Contemporary classical
- Occupation: Chamber ensemble
- Years active: 1992-present
- Labels: Querstand
- Members: Walter Klingner, oboe and cor anglais Axel Andrae, bassoon Matthias Sannemüller, viola Thomas Blumenthal, guitar

Ensemble Sortisatio is a quartet (viola, oboe/cor anglais, bassoon and guitar) founded by violist Matthias Sannemüller in 1992 in Leipzig, Germany. Its members are mostly soloists at the MDR Symphony Orchestra. They have specialized in contemporary classical music.

== Formation ==
The Ensemble Sortisatio was founded in 1992 by Matthias Sannemüller in the city of Leipzig. Sannemüller was a pupil from Dietmar Hallmann and member of the Gruppe Neue Musik Hanns Eisler.

The name comes from the Sortisatio concept and refers to the casual combination of the instruments in the ensemble. The idea came from the composer Reiner Bredemeyer.

Members of the quartet are Walter Klingner (oboe and cor anglais), Axel Andrae (bassoon), Matthias Sannemüller (viola) and Thomas Blumenthal (guitar). They are mostly soloists at the MDR Symphony Orchestra in Leipzig.

Sortisatio is today one of the most unusual ensembles in Germany. It inspired many national and international composers to write for them. They have worked with Karl Ottomar Treibmann, Günter Neubert, Thomas Müller, Christian Münch, Thomas Buchholz, Steffen Schleiermacher, Thomas Christoph Heyde, Helmut Oehring, Gerd Domhardt and other German composers.

=== 8 Pieces on Paul Klee ===
The Swiss/Austrian Groupe Lacroix (Marianne Schroeder, John Wolf Brennan, Jean-Luc Darbellay, Christian Henking, Michael Schneider, Michael Radanovics and Alfons Karl Zwicker) and Thüring Bräm dedicated 8 Pieces on Paul Klee to the Anniversary of the Central German Broadcasting. This composers group attended a master class with the Russian musician Edison Denisov. The work after Paul Klee was first performed by the Ensemble in Germany and Switzerland. Hong Kong composer Chan Wing-wah dedicated a trio Oriental Garden on Paul Klee in Bern & Winterthur to the Ensemble Sortisatio. Chan invited them to Hong Kong in 2009.

=== Ensemble Sortisatio ===
Sortisatios second record consists of compositions written by Michael Stöckigt, Reiner Bredemeyer, Gerd Sannemüller, Pēteris Vasks from Latvia, Thomas Böttger, Jean-Luc Darbellay from Switzerland, Helmut Bieler and Jean-Louis Petit from France.

== Repertoire (Extract) ==
The following works were specially composed for the Ensemble Sortisatio:

Composer	Work
Michael Stöckigt	Aspekte zu Mozart
Reiner Bredemeyer	Quartett-Stücke 7 & Leipzig ein und Leipzig
Gerd Sannemüller	Drei Essays
Peteris Vasks	Drei Blicke
Thomas Böttger	Danse oubliée
Jean-Luc Darbellay	Quartetto & Sozusagen
Helmut Bieler	Szenen für Ensemble
Jean-Louis Petit	Sortisatio l
Thüring Bräm	Besessenes Mädchen
Michael Schneider	Shark Turtle Ray
Marianne Schroeder	Wie der Klee vierblättrig wurde: Quartett
John Wolf Brennan	N-gl
Alfons Karl Zwicker	Trauernd
Michael Radanovics	Entweihte Sphinx, Die Sphinx geht
Christian Wolff	In between Piece for 3 players
John Cage	For 3 voices
Steffen Schleiermacher	Quartett & Stockend Fließend
Antoine Beuger	die Stille, die Zeichen
Karl Ottomar Treibmann	Consort-Sonate & Kommen und Gehen
Christian Münch	quartetto da capo
Gerd Domhardt	Orpheus: Fragmente III
Helmut Oehring	Lethal Injektion & dersu
Günter Neubert	Triptychon
Werner Thielemann	Hommage für Marc Chagall
Thomas Buchholz	Fluxion 111
Helmut Bieler	Szenen für Ensemble
Alfred Thomas Müller	Proteus
Willi Vogl	Grüne lnseln
Thomas Christoph Heyde	Ansichtennetz
Péter Kőszeghy	Crossover
Caspar René Hirschfeld	quattro balli sorteggiati

== Discography ==
Year	Album	Composer	Interpreter	Label
2003	8 Pieces on Paul Klee	Groupe Lacroix	Ensemble Sortisatio	Creative Works Records
2004	Ensemble Sortisatio	Reiner Bredemeyer, Pēteris Vasks, Jean-Louis Petit a.o.	Ensemble Sortisatio	Querstand
2009	A Portrait	Jean-Luc Darbellay	MDR Symphony Orchestra, Ensemble Sortisatio, Leipziger Schlagzeugensemble, Leipziger Hornquartett, Fabio Luisi (dr)	Claves Records
