= Werner Bärtschi =

Swiss composer and pianist

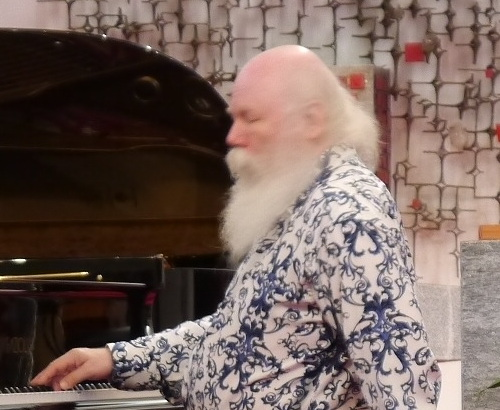
Werner Bärtschi in Saas-Fee (2014)

Werner Bärtschi (born 1 January 1950) is a Swiss composer and classical pianist.

== Life ==
Born in Zurich, Bärtschi studied piano with Sava Savoff, Jürg Wyttenbach and Rolf Mäser, composition with Armin Schibler, Klaus Huber and Rudolf Kelterborn and orchestral conducting with Erich Schmid at the Universities of Zurich and Basel. He was influenced by the music of John Cage and Dieter Schnebel.

In 1980, Bärtschi founded the concert series Rezital Zürich. In 1987, he became artistic director of the Musikkollegium Zürcher Oberland. From 1990 to 1992, he was president of the music commission of the city of Zurich. He is also the initiator of cycles and festivals such as the Satie season (1980/81), the Ives cycle (1985/86) and the June Festival Week (1991). Bärtschi is active in the composers' secretariat in Zurich, which includes Ulrich Gasser, Max E. Keller, Martin Sigrist and Peter Wettstein.

He brought works by John Cage, Klaus Huber, Wladimir Rudolfowitsch Vogel, Dieter Schnebel, Terry Riley and Wilhelm Killmayer to their world premieres.

Among his students were Alfons Karl Zwicker and Roger Girod.

In 1983, he won the Grand Prix du Disque.

== Recordings ==
- Pierre Mariétan (Grammont Porträt, 1992)
- Kreuzende Wege – Komponistensekretariat Zürich (Grammont Porträt, 1997)
- Basel Sinfonietta (Grammont Porträt, 2001)
- Rotondo or "die Kunst des Fügens" (stv/asm, 2002)
- Marcela Pavia – Max E. Keller (NEOS, 2011)
