= Has Head, Hand, Feet and Heart =

1930 painting by Paul Klee

Has Head, Hand, Feet and Heart is a watercolor by Paul Klee painted in 1930. It is held at the Kunstsammlung Nordrhein-Westfalen, in Düsseldorf, which acquired this painting in 1960 with the collection of the Pittsburgh entrepreneur G. David Thompson.

== History ==
The origin of the title of the picture is unclear. On one hand, the Bauhaus Dessau organised a "bart-herzen-nase-fest" (beard heart-nose festival) in 1928, at which Klee's student Herbert Bayer was also present. On the other hand, Klee chose the title Nase, Mund, Brüste; Büste, Lippen, Brüste (nose, mouth, breasts; bust, lips, breasts) for another work as early as 1927. Klee's friend Hans Arp also created a painting called Kopf, Augen, Nase, Schnurrbart (Head, eyes, nose, moustache).

== Description ==
A small red heart is centrally located in a broad pale red cross that extends almost across the entire image. In the upper left-hand corner, in the manner of a child's drawing, a stylized head with a white headband, plate-round blue eyes without pupils, the nose marked by a thin line, below it a tiny mouth, indicated by two parallel lines. Clockwise, in the next corners, on each elongated grey-blue colour spot, there follows a stick with one hand, a stick with hand and foot and another stick with a foot, which, like the other parts of the body, is executed in a pale red colour. The ground of the picture is in a broken white with slight grey or blue-grey shadows on the ground and in the upper left corner of the picture.

== Interpretation ==
The watercolour is seen as a disguised depiction of Christ with a parodistic undertone. With regard to the blasphemy trial against George Grosz, Klee wanted to avoid a possible blasphemy accusation. The picture shows an atheistic position, clearly documented from text and picture testimonies of the artist from his entire creative period.

== Reception ==
In 1999, Marianne Schroeder was influenced by the watercolour for her composition Wie der Klee vierblättrig wurde (How the clover became four-leaved). The work was premiered by the Ensemble Sortisatio and recorded on the CD 8 Pieces on Paul Klee.

== See also ==
- List of works by Paul Klee
