= Chris Hung (composer) =

Music composer from Hong Kong

Chris Hung 洪銘健
- Born: 13 April 1977 (age 48); Hong Kong

Chris Hung (洪銘健; born 13 April 1977) is a Hong Kong composer and teacher.

== Early life and education ==
Chris Hung was born on 13 April 1977 in Hong Kong.

He pursued research in the field of composition. In 2009, Hung obtained the Doctor of Music degree at the Chinese University of Hong Kong, under the tutelage of professors Chan Wing Wah and Victor Chan.

== Music compositions ==
Hung's creative outputs amount to over 70 works, including orchestral and large-scale ensemble works. His works have appeared in over 20 countries in various contemporary music festivals, such as the 2015 ISCM World Music Days in Slovenia, the 2016 Beijing Modern Music Festival in China, and the 2017 Music Biennale Zagreb in Croatia.

In 2015, Chris Hung was invited to compose "Variation of Chung Chi College Theme Song" to celebrate the 50th Anniversary of the Music Department of the Chinese University of Hong Kong.

In 2016, he composed "We Are All Jubileans", a theme song celebrating the 55th Anniversary of his alma mater, Bishop Hall Jubilee School.

== Style and reception ==
Hung's music is often mixed with order but contains a palette of chaotic complexity. His compositions are inspired by a fusion of Western and Eastern philosophical concepts.

Hung's orchestral piece Sunrise (2005, revised 2009) premiered in Musicarama 2010 in Hong Kong. Ken Smith of Financial Times revealed that "Christopher Hung Ming-kin’s recently revised Sunrise (2005) fared better".

Hung's Voyage with Six Dragons for large orchestra (2012, 2016) premiered in the Beijing Music Modern Festival in 2016. It was reported as "a meticulous attempt on the balance of the sound of modern music".

Hung's String Quartet No.3 Moment Musicaux (2014) was prominent in timbral setting with shimmering harmonics. Smith highlighted the quartet's "timbral daring".

In the 2010 Asian Composers' League Festival in Tokyo, Hung performed his choral work Peony Pavilion (2010). According to Australian composer Dr. Bruce Crossman, it was "beautifully evoked by Hung in a type of ordered chaos".

== Other work ==
Chris Hung has been a Council Director of the Hong Kong Composers' Guild since 2014 and a member of Composers and Authors Society of Hong Kong since 2008. In May 2018, he attended the International Rostrum of Composers in Budapest a delegate for Hong Kong.

Hung teaches various music courses and lectures in the School of Continuing Education of the Hong Kong Baptist University and LiPACE of the Open University of Hong Kong.

== Composition awards ==
- Third, Sun River New Composition Competition (2008; Chengdu, China)
- Second, International Composers' Competition on the occasion of 90th Anniversary of the I. J. Paderewski Academy of Music (2010; Poznań, Poland)
- First, "Sofia 2013" International Composition Competition (2013; Sofia, Bulgaria)
- First, The 32nd ALEA III International Composition Competition (2016; Boston, USA)
- Honourable Mention: Ding Yi International Chinese Composition Competition (2012; Singapore)
- Honourable Mention: Les Pois Music Office (2016; Kyoto, Japan)

== Selected discography and publications ==
- Ever-changing Veins of Stone. In: Resonating Colours 4 - CD Compilation by Hong Kong Composers. CD. Hong Kong Composer's Guild, 2014
- Borobudur. In: Chinese Orchestral Works by Hong Kong Composers. CD. HUGO, 2015
- Moment Musicaux. In: Florence String Quartet Call For Scores 2014 - Music by the Awarded Composers. Quartetto Ascanio. CD. Collana ARCHIVI DEL XXI° Secolo, 2014

== Selected works ==
=== Orchestral works ===
- Symphonic Apologue "Of Lion Rock Memento" for orchestra (2024)
- Sunrise for chamber orchestra (2005, revised 2009)
- Symphony No. 1 for orchestra (2005)
- Symphony No. 2 "Towards a Harmonious World" for orchestra (2005–06)
- Song of the Birds' Gorge for string orchestra (2007, revised 2009)
- Then Evening Lantern Festival for soprano and orchestra (2009)
- Symphonic Prelude for orchestra (2009)
- Stone Sentinel Maze for Chinese orchestra (2009, revised 2013)
- Lantern Romance for orchestra (2009, 2014)
- Borobudur for Chinese orchestra (2011)
- Metamorphosis of Dragon's Six Levels for orchestra (2012)
- Concerto Funèbre for solo viola and string orchestra (2012–13)
- The Yu Lan Festival for Chinese orchestra (2015)
- Voyage with Six Dragons for large orchestra (2012, 2016)
- Symphony No.3 "Metamorphosis On a Soul's Incarnation" for orchestra (2016)
- Bald Mountain ‧ Echoed Sound (version for Chinese orchestra) (2017)
- A Ritual Wind(s)cape for a large wind band (2017–18)

=== Chamber works ===
- Epilogue for a Tragedy for flute, violin, cello and piano (2005)
- Ville Froide for oboe, clarinet, violin, cello, double bass and piano (2008, revised 2010)
- Song of Birds' Gorge for flute, clarinet, sheng, piano, violin, viola and cello (2009, revised 2014)
- Lux for 10 instruments (2010, revised 2011)
- Ghost Town for flute, clarinet, violin and cello (2010, revised 2014)
- Infinite Soundscape for flute and cello (2010)
- Ever-changing Veins of Stone for flute, cello and piano (2010)
- Divertimento for two flutes (2010, revised 2017)
- Fluorescence for flute, oboe, clarinet, viola and cello (2011)
- The Feast of Yu Lan for Chinese ensemble (2014–15)
- Samsara II for guitar and left-hand piano (2014, revised 2016)
- Variation of Chung Chi College Theme Song for Chinese ensemble (2015)
- Unto the Twilight Zone (version for solo piano and ensemble (2016); version for chamber orchestra (2016, 2018))
- Bald Mountain ‧ Echoed Sound (version for dizi, yangqin, violin, viola and cello (2016); version for 8 Chinese instruments (2016))
- Towards a Harmonious World II for saxophone, two guitars, two mandolins and piano (2017)
- Villain Hitting Under the bridge in Causeway Bay for violin, viola, cello and piano (2018)

=== Work for percussion ===
- RED for four percussionists (2010)
- Vibrant City for five percussionists (2014)

=== String quartets ===
- String Quartet No.1 (2005)
- String Quartet No.2 (2007, revised 2008)
- String Quartet No.3 "Moment Musicaux" (2014)
- Leaving for string quartet (2015)

=== Solo works ===
- Scars of Time (version for bass clarinet) (2010)
- Frozen Eternity for piano four-hand and solo piano (2012–13)
- Luminoso for solo piano (2013)
- Sands of Time for bassoon (2010, revised 2014)
- Cold City for solo marimba (2015, revised 2017)
- In Memoriam for solo accordion (2017)

=== Music with voice(s) ===
- Peony Pavilion for mixed a capella (2010)
- Song of Jeong Gwa Jeong for mixed a cappella (2010, revised 2014)
- Kyrie for four-part mixed chorus (2016)
- We Are All Jubileans for mixed choir (BHJS 55th Anniversary Theme Song) (2016)
- Variation of Eurydice for soprano, harp and frame drum (2018)

=== Electronic music ===
- "Time Traversal" (2005)
- Cosmos Palladium for flute and Max/MSP (2005)
