= Jean-Louis Petit =

Jean-Louis Petit may refer to:

- Jean-Louis Petit (composer)
- Jean-Louis Petit (surgeon)
