= Klingner =

Klingner is a German surname. Notable people with the surname include:

- Bernd Klingner (born 1940), German sports shooter
- Friedrich Klingner (1894–1968), German classical philologist
- Walter Klingner (born 1961), German oboist and cor anglais player
