= Michael Radanovics =

Austrian composer and violinist (born 1958)

Michael Radanovics (born 19 March 1958) is an Austrian violinist (jazz and classic) and composer.

== Life ==
Born in Steyr, Radanovics passed his school-leaving examination in 1976. He studied violin with Michael Frischenschlager from 1977 to 1985 and music education at the University of Music and Performing Arts Vienna from 1978 to 1981. He studied jazz theory from 1981 to 1985 with Karl Heinz Czadek at the Music and Arts University of the City of Vienna.

From 1982 to 1985 he was a member of the jazz band Augmented Nine, and from 1983 to 1988 of the symphony orchestra of the Volksoper Wien. Since 1988 he has played in the Radio-Symphony Orchestra Wien. In 1987 he co-founded the Motus Quartet, playing as primarius until 2000. The string quartet continued to belong to Tscho Theissing (violin), Franz Bayer (viola) and Michael Dallinger (cello). Radanovics composed and arranged jazz and improvised music for the instrumentation. Concert tours have taken him through Europe, America, and Asia.

Radanovics has published educational literature with Universal Edition since 1990. Since 2000 he has been the editor of a songbook by Roland Neuwirth at the Musikverlag Doblinger, in whose New Folk Music group Extremschrammeln he played since 1998. In 2003 he founded the duo Zimt & Zauber with the singer Petra Hartl.

Since 1996, Radanovics has been a member of the Swiss composers group Groupe Lacroix.

== Awards ==
- 1994: 2. Prize at the Leibnitz Art Prize for Jazz Composition (for Metafile for Frank)
- 1998: 3. Prize at the Franz Joseph Reindl Composition Competition.
- 2003: 3. Prize at the Musikforum Viktring of the city of Klagenfurt. (for Das Wunder der Zahlen)
- 2007: Winner of the "Vinum et Litterae" competition, Krems on the Danube

== Publications ==
- 1990: Jazzy Violin 1 (Universal Edition)
- 1992: Jazzy Violin 2 (Universal Edition)
- 1993: Liederbuch Fuer 2 Geigen (Universal Edition)
- 1994: Children’s songs (Universal Edition)
- 1994: Jazzy Cello 1 (Universal Edition)
- 1995: Favorites (Universal Edition)
- 1998: Folk & Fiddle (Universal Edition)
- 1999: Riffs & Tunes (Doblinger Verlag)

== Discography ==
- 1994: Crimson Flames (Creative Works Records) with the Motus Quartett
- 1996: Introversion (Musicaphon) with Nebojša Jovan Živković (Marimba/Vibraphon), Österreichische Kammersymphoniker, Ernst Theis (conductor)
- 2003: Groupe Lacroix: 8 Pieces on Paul Klee (Creative Works Records) with the Ensemble Sortisatio
- 2006: Train Songs (CCNC) with the Spring String Quartet
- 2008: Wo der Wind herwaht (Extraplatte) with Petra Hartl
- 2009: In mir daham (Extraplatte) with Petra Hartl
- 2011: MondoLine/Du Liebst (Sturm & Klang) with Konstantin Wecker

== Literature ==
- Radanovics, Michael. Online-edition, Vienna 2002 ff., ISBN 3-7001-3077-5; Print edition: Volume 4, published by the Austrian Academy of Sciences, Vienna 2005.
- Radanovics, Michael. In Axel Schniederjürgen (ed.): Kürschners Musiker-Handbuch. 5th edition, Saur Verlag, Munich 2006, ISBN 3-598-24212-3, p. 369.
