= Axel Schmidt (oboist) =

German cor anglais player and oboist (1940–2024)

Axel Schmidt (19 August 1940 – 9 December 2024) was a German cor anglais player and oboist.

== Life ==
Born in Zwickau, Schmidt learned to play the oboe from Alfred Gleißberg, the solo oboist of the Gewandhausorchester Leipzig and Peter Fischer at the Leipzig Gewandhaus Orchestra.

From 1962 to 1964, Schmidt worked with the Schweriner Philharmonie. In 1964, he became solo English horn player with the MDR Leipzig Radio Symphony Orchestra under the conduct of Herbert Kegel. He was interpreter of early music in the Pro Arte Antiqua Lipsienis, the Telemann-Ensemble and the Capella Fidicinia under the direction of the musicologist Hans Grüß. In 1970, he became a member of the Gruppe Neue Musik Hanns Eisler and the Leipziger Consort, who devoted themselves to Neue Musik. In 1992, he founded the Trio PianOvo.

He taught English horn and since 1976 oboe; in 1993 he became professor at the Hochschule für Musik Franz Liszt, Weimar. There he acted as dean and Prorector. His students include Michael Goldammer, Walter Klingner, Sebastian Röthig and Gunter Sieberth. He was also a guest lecturer in the Netherlands, Poland, Czech Republic, Finland and Great Britain.

== Discography ==
- 1986: Luca Lombardi: Einklang für Oboe und sieben Instrumente (VEB Deutsche Schallplatten)
- 1996: Neue Musik für Oboe (Edel Classics)
- 2002: Musik in Deutschland 1950–2000 (Red Seal)

== Literature ==
- Burkhard Glaetzner, Reiner Kontressowitz (ed.): Gruppe Neue Musik „Hanns Eisler“ 1970–1990. Spiel-Horizonte. Leipzig 1990, p. 50.
- Annelie Schneider: Vereint Tradition und Moderne. Axel Schmidt, Oboe. Resonanz. I/2002,p. 12 f.
