= Margrit Zimmermann =

Swiss composer, conductor, pianist, and music educator (1927–2020)

Margrit Zimmermann (7 August 1927 – 23 February 2020) was a Swiss pianist, composer, conductor and music educator. She taught music and worked as a conductor in Bern, where she also established an orchestra. She was awarded the Jubiläumsstiftung der Schweizerischen Bankgesellschaft award in 1986, female composer awards from the city of Unna and the city of Kassel, and an award from the Japan International League of Artists in Tokyo in 1989.

== Life ==
Zimmerman was born in Bern on 7 August 1927. She studied piano there under Jeanne Bovet and composition under Walter Furrer. Later she studied under Denise Bidal and Alfred Cortot in Lausanne. She continued her education at the École Normale de Musique de Paris, studying composition under Arthur Honegger, and graduated in piano in 1952.

Zimmermann trained as a conductor under Ewald Körner in Bern and took master courses from Igor Markevitch in Monte Carlo and Hans Swarowski in Ossiach. She taught music for several years and worked as a conductor. She studied composition with Aurelio Maggioni and Umberto Rotondi and at the Giuseppe Verdi Conservatory in Milan, where she received her diploma in composition in 1978. She also studied opera conducting under Umberto Cattini.

In 1973, Margrit Zimmermann established an orchestra in Bern. She received the Jubiläumsstiftung der Schweizerischen Bankgesellschaft award in 1986, female composer awards from the city of Unna and the city of Kassel, and an award from the Japan International League of Artists in Tokyo in 1989.

She died in Bern, Switzerland in 2020.

== Works ==
Zimmermann has composed works for chamber orchestra, voice and symphonic orchestra, ballet music, solo works for piano, string and wind instruments, and guitar, including:

- Drei Lieder, op. 5 (1977–78)
- Musica per nove archi, op. 17 (1977)
- Suoni, op. 4 (1978)
- Quartetto d'archi Nr. 1, op. 7 (string quartet N°1, op.7) (1979–1982)
- Introduzione, Allegro, Episodio I - II - III, Alla marcia et Fugato.
- Introduzione e Allegro, op. 12 (1979) Symphony for large orchestra
- Der Politiker: Braucht der Mensch Freiheit?, op. 6 (1979) for one speaking voice, double bass and piano
- Musica, op. 8 (1980) for violoncello and piano
- Per Sei, op. 9 (1980) for flute, violin, viola, violoncello, piano and timpani
- Quartetto d'archi Nr. 2, op. 11 (1980)
- Quartetto d'archi Nr. 3, "Il giuoco", op. 16 (1981)
- Black Box, op. 19 (1981–82) for oboe, clarinet, horn and bassoon
- Capriccio, op. 19 (1982) for one voice and piano
- Duetto, op. 26 (1982) for violoncello and guitar
- Spiegelungen des Tages, op. 34 (1984/90)
- Fantasia duetto, op. 29 (1984) for flute and guitar
- Pezzi Brevi, op. 30 (1984) for guitar
- Bianchi-Neri, op. 36 (1984) for piano
- Pensieri, op. 31 (1984) 3 sonnets for tenor, guitar and flute
- Plis, op. 37 (1985) Symphony for tenor and solo instruments
- Dialog, op. 38 (1985) for flute and piano
- Fuori Dentro, op. 70 (1985) for piano
- Visione, op. 32 (1985) for guitar and piano
- Sonate für Violine solo, op. 33 (sonata for violin solo, op. 33) (1985)
- Pizzicato, op. 68 (1985) for violin
- Orphische Tänze, op. 43 (1986) Quintet for flute, clarinet, viola, violoncello and piano
- Aus dem Tagebuch einer Prinzessin, op. 44 (1986) for piano
- Rapsodie, op. 41 (1986) for solo violin, guitar, 2 violins, viola, violoncello and double bass
- L'illusione per violoncello solo, op. 42 (1986)
- Gehen/Sucht/Morgen, op. 45 (1986) Trio for alto voice, violoncello and piano
- Panta Rhei, op. 39 (1987) for violin solo, soprano, female choir and organ
- Pianorama, op. 59 (1987) Concert for piano and string orchestra
- Die Gestundete Zeit, op. 52 (1987) for voice and instrumental ensemble
- Piano Time, op. 46 (1987) Toccata for piano solo
- Cloccachorda, op. 40 (1987) for piano
- Quadriga, op. 51 (1987) for piano
- Spuren innerer Kreise, op. 53 (1988) for 16 voices
- Murooji per chitarra solo, op. 57 (1988)
- Alle 7 Jahre, op. 58 (1989) for soprano and piano
- Rhapsodie For Two, op. 52 (1990) for clarinet and piano
- Wo sich berühren Raum und Zeit, op. 60 (1990) for nine female voices
- Triptychon, op. 58 (1990) for trombone and organ
- Serenade, op. 62 (1992) for flute and piano
- In Urbis Honorem, op. 61 (1992) for mixed choir and orchestra, after texts from "Das Jahr der Stadt" by Georg Schaeffner.
- Incontro, op. 93 (1992) Duettino for flute and euphonium
- Gesänge der Liebe, op. 102 (1994–1995) for soprano and piano
- Italiam! Italiam!, op. 106 (1995) for one speaking voice, clarinet and military drum
- OMEGA: dentro fuori, op. 57 (1996)for flute (with string effects in the piano)
- Capriccio, op. 63 (1998–1999) for piano
- Il Flauto magico, op. 77, 1 (1999) for flute
- Allegro Giocoso, op. 100 (2000) for piano
- Esperanza, op. 102 (2000) for flute
