= Max E. Keller =

Swiss musician

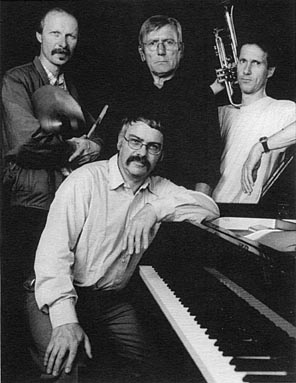
Max-E-Keller-am-Klavier-mit-Dani-Schaffner-Hans-Suter-Stefan-Wyler-Copyright-Foto-Monica-Boirar-aka-Monica-Beurer.jpg

Max Eugen Keller (born 19 March 1947, Aarau) is a Swiss composer, jazz pianist and improvising musician. He was one of the first free-jazz musicians in Switzerland. Since 2007 he is chairman of the Swiss Society for New Music.

== Life and work ==
Keller studied (fellowship by the Heinrich Strobel Foundation in Freiburg, Germany) musicology, history and composition with Hans Ulrich Lehmann and Helmut Lachenmann at the City of Basel Music Academy and with Nicolaus A. Huber and Thomas Kessler.

In 1966 he began his career as one of the first Swiss artists of free jazz. In 1967, he had a sensational performance at the Zurich Jazz Festival. He played in various bands in concerts and on radio broadcasts in Europe.

Since 1980 he worked as an improvising musician (piano and electronic musical instruments) again. Concerts have taken him to South America, Germany, the Netherlands and Switzerland. He worked together with Dani Schaffner, Christoph Gallio, Peter A. Schmid, Mathias Rissi, Kurt Grämiger, Daniel Mouthon, Thomas Borgmann, Hans Koch, Urs Leimgruber, Günter Müller, Hans Hassler, Charlotte Hug, Matthias Ziegler, Christian Wolfarth, Günter Heinz and Barry Guy.

He has composed about 100 works, including electronic music. He produce a chamber opera (commission of the Komische Oper Berlin) and several songs. His compositions have been performed in Europe, Australia, South Africa, North and South America, Russia, Korea, China, Mongolia and Azerbaijan (including the World Music Days in Zurich (1991) and Mexico (1993)). Performers were the Orchester Musikkollegium Winterthur, the Tonhalle Orchester Zürich, the Ensemble Sortisatio and the Hanns Eisler New Music Group.

From 2007 to 2010 he is chairman of the Swiss Society for Contemporary Music (successor to Jean-Luc Darbellay).

== Awards ==
- 1997: Carl Heinrich Ernst Art Prize
- 2006: Art Prize of Winterthur
