= Frischenschlager =

Frischenschlager is a German surname. Notable people with the surname include:

- Friedhelm Frischenschlager (born 1943), Austrian politician
- Michael Frischenschlager (born 1935), Austrian violinist
