= Caspar René Hirschfeld =

German composer

Caspar René Hirschfeld (born 21 May 1965) is a German composer and violinist.

== Life ==
Born 1965 in Wernigerode, Hirschfeld received his first violin lessons at the music school from the age of 5. At the age of 9 he began composing. From 1982 to 1987 he studied composition with Udo Zimmermann and Wilfried Krätzschmar and violin with Christian Redder at the Hochschule für Musik Carl Maria von Weber Dresden. Until 1989 he was master class student of Udo Zimmermann. Other important mentors were Paul-Heinz Dittrich, Gret Palucca, the dancer Thomas Hartmann and the painter Günter Firit.

From 1987 to 1994 Hirschfeld taught at the Dresden Academy of Music and the Hochschule für Musik "Hanns Eisler" in Berlin. He also worked at the ACMP Foundation in New York and at the Rheinsberg Music Academy. Besides being a composer, he appeared in the 90s as a dancer and performance artist as well as a pianist and Liedbegleiter.

Hirschfeld's compositional oeuvre includes a large number of symphonic works and chamber music as well as choral music, ballets, two chamber operas, solo works and songs as well as tango and jazz cycles. In 1991 his chamber opera Bianca was premiered at the Salzburg Festival. In 2005 his work Wandlungen V - Doppelkonzert für Violine, Violoncello und Orchester was premiered at the Magdeburg Cathedral for the award of the Kaiser-Otto-Preis to former Federal President of Germany Richard von Weizsäcker. In 2024, the New Chamber Ballet New York performed the production PI, based on music by Hirschfeld and visual arts by Korvin Reich, at the Magdeburg Art Museum. Retrieved 2026-1-19.

Until 2023 Hirschfelds works have been published by Verlag Neue Musik Berlin and Friedrich Hofmeister Musikverlag Leipzig. In 2023 he was offered a contract for his entire oeuvre by Verlag Neue Musik Berlin.

Hirschfeld enjoys close collaborations with, among others, his husband, the visual artist and poet Korvin Reich, and the pianist Joshua Rupley. In 2025, Rupley performed, among other works, the world premiere of Hirschfeld's Piano Concerto No. 3, "nacht.wachen". He also recorded Hirschfeld's monumental piano cycle "Musik für Piano solo" for the TYXart label, which received excellent reviews. PianoNEWS writes: "This important work of contemporary piano music should be part of every pianist's standard repertoire" (PianoNEWS 4/2025, review by Robert Nemecek). The American music magazine *Fanfare* calls it "Music for the ages" and "A piece you must hear if you are concerned whether classical music has a future" (Fanfare Magazine print edition November/December 2025).

His musical language can be attributed to contemporary classical music, but cannot be assigned to a particular school, since his personal style combines a wide variety of influences. In many works, strongly motoric elements and culminating drama are contrasted with a distinct internalization and singing and gestural-dancing.

Until 2022 Hirschfeld also performed as a violinist, primarily with Baroque music (among others with the Albert/Hirschfeld Duo with the guitarist Sebastian Albert) and contemporary music

== Awards ==
- Carl Maria von Weber Prize of the city of Dresden (1984)
- Mendelssohn Scholarship of the Ministry of Culture of the GDR (1987/88)
- Göttinger Gitarrenpreis (2000)
- Carl von Ossietzky Kompositionspreis (2015)

== Albums ==
(selection) 1998 Lieder & Sonette (kreuzberg records) 2018 Chamber Music (col legno) 2019 solitudes (col legno) 2024 PI (kreuzberg records) 2025 Music for Piano solo (TYXart) and online albums

== Literature ==
- Hirschfeld, Caspar René. In Peter Hollfelder: Klaviermusik. Internationales chronologisches Lexikon. Geschichte. Komponisten. Werke. Supplement, Noetzel, Wilhelmshaven 2005, ISBN 3-7959-0855-8, p. 102.
- Hirschfeld, Caspar René. In Axel Schniederjürgen (ed.): Kürschners Musiker-Handbuch. 5. Auflage, Saur Verlag, Munnich 2006, ISBN 3-598-24212-3, p. 187.
