= Helmut Bieler =

German composer and pianist (1940–2019)

Helmut Bieler (7 June 1940 in Gersfeld, Hesse-Nassau – 11 January 2019 in Rimsting) was a German composer and pianist. He studied composition with Franz Xaver Lehner and Fritz Schieri, piano with Friedrich Wührer and Aldo Schoen and learned music at the University for Music and Performing Arts, Munich. From 1967 to 1979 he taught at the Markgräfin-Wilhelmine-Gymnasium, Bayreuth. In 1979 he became a docent and 1988 a professor of music education at the University of Bayreuth. He founded the Ensemble Musica Viva (Bayreuth) in 1980 and the Bayreuth Days of Contemporary Music in 1988. His music has been performed in Europe (e.g. Gaudeamus Muziekweek and ISCM World Music Days Festival in Aarhus, Ensemble Sortisatio), Russia and the USA.

== Prizes ==
- 1980: Prize for the Promotion of Culture by the City of Nuremberg
- 1992: Cultural Prize of the City of Bayreuth
- 2008: Friedrich Baur Prize of the Bavarian Academy of Fine Arts
