= Marianne Schroeder =

Swiss pianist and composer (born 1949)

Marianne Schroeder (born 1949 in Reiden) is a Swiss pianist and composer. She studied with Giacinto Scelsi. She played at Carnegie Hall, Lucerne Festival and Théâtre des Champs-Élysées. She worked with John Cage and Shigeru Kan-no.

She is a member of the Groupe Lacroix and as such is specialized in contemporary classical music. As a member of the Groupe Lacroix she has worked with international musicians, such as the Ensemble Sortisatio.

== Discography ==
- Braxton & Stockhausen (hatART, 1984), with Garrett List, works by Anthony Braxton and Karlheinz Stockhausen (Klavierstücke VI–VIII)
- Petra (Blank Forms Editions, 2019), with Stefan Tcherepnin, live recording of Petra, for two pianos (1991) by Maryanne Amacher

With the Groupe Lacroix

- 1997: The Composer Group together with the Moscow Rachmaninov Trio (Creative Works Records)
- 2003: 8 Pieces on Paul Klee together with the Ensemble Sortisatio (Creative Works Records)

With Anthony Braxton

- Four Compositions (Solo, Duo & Trio) 1982/1988 (hatART, 1989)
