= Dieter Zahn =

German musician

Dieter Zahn (born 8 February 1940) is a German double bassist.

== Life ==
Born in Magdeburg, from the age of 14 Zahn received lessons of double bass from F. Richter at the Fachschule für Musik Magdeburg. From 1958 to 1961 he studied with Heinz Zimmer at the Hochschule für Musik "Hanns Eisler" in Berlin. In 1961 he became a musician with the orchestra of the Komische Oper Berlin. In 1967 he became principal bassist at the Rundfunk Symphony Orchestra Leipzig. In 1970 he was one of the founding members of the Gruppe Neue Musik Hanns Eisler. From 1983 he was also a member of the Leipziger Consort. Concerts have taken him to many countries in Europe and Central America. With the Eisler Group he has received several awards, including the Art Prize of the GDR. (1980), the badge of honour of the Verband der Komponisten und Musikwissenschaftler der DDR in Gold (1988) and the Schneider-Schott Music Prize of Mainz (1991).

== Literature ==
- Burkhard Glaetzner, Reiner Kontressowitz (ed.): Gruppe Neue Musik "Hanns Eisler" 1970–1990. Spiel-Horizonte. Leipzig 1990, p. 58.
