= Siegfried Stöckigt =

German classical pianist

Siegfried Stöckigt (8 December 1929 – 6 July 2012) was a German classical pianist.

== Life ==
Born Lengenfeld, Stöckigt grew up with a brother three years older than him in the small town of Lengenfeld (Amtshauptmannschaft Auerbach) in SaxonyVogtland as the son of a businessman. At the age of nine, Stöckigt received his first piano lessons.

From 1946 to 1959, he studied piano with Hugo Steurer at the University of Music and Theatre Leipzig. He passed his exams with distinction. In 1951, he was the only German prize-winner at the World Festival of Youth and Students in Berlin. From 1952 to 1985, he taught at the Hochschule für Musik "Hanns Eisler" and was appointed a Professor in 1968.

In 1959, he received a medal at the Geneva International Music Competition. In 1966, he was awarded the Art Prize of the GDR, in 1974 the National Prize of the German Democratic Republic and in October 1974 the National Prize of the GDR.

Guest performances took him to several European countries, to South America and Central America and to the Near East. He received record, radio and television engagements. In addition to interpreting classical music, Stöckigt was also active in the field of light music and jazz. He also performed under the name Rainer Carell.

In addition to his pianistic and pedagogical activities, Prof. Stöckigt also appeared as a composer of chamber music concert music.

He was married to the broadcaster Annemarie Forkel-Stöckigt and last lived in Königs Wusterhausen. His son Michael Stöckigt is also a pianist.
