= Gerd Sannemüller =

German composer, pianist, and musicologist

Gerd Sannemüller (19 October 1914, Heilbad Heiligenstadt – 13 June 2008) was a German composer, pianist and musicologist. After his Abitur in Stralsund he studied musicology with Arnold Schering and Georg Schünemann as well as history, philosophy and psychology at the University of Berlin and school music at the Berlin College for Church and School Music. After university he became a high school teacher and a concert pianist in Berlin. Later he studied musicology with Hans Albrecht, Friedrich Blume and Kurt Gudewill as well as history and psychology at the University of Kiel. In 1961 he received his Doctor of Philosophy degree.

He was a docent at the Flensburg College of Education and at the Kiel College of Education. From 1965 to 1983 he served as a professor of musicology and music education in Kiel. During that time he was director of the Institute of Music and Didactics. He was mostly interested in music by Maurice Ravel, Paul Hindemith, Béla Bartók and Polish contemporary classical music (Witold Lutosławski and Karol Szymanowski). He was an editor of the complete works of Paul Hindemith at the Hindemith Institute in Frankfurt. His compositions are consistently played at the Theatre of Kiel. He also composed for musicians such as the Ensemble Sortisatio (CD Ensemble Sortisatio VKJK 0325).

Gerd Sannemüllers brother was the violinist Horst Sannemüller whom he often accompanied on the piano.
