= Thüring Bräm =

Swiss composer and conductor

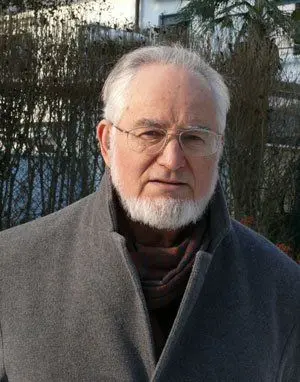
Bräm, date unknown

Thüring Bräm (born 10 April 1944) is a Swiss composer and conductor.

Bräm graduated from a high school in Basel. He then studied piano, conducting and composition in Basel and musicology at the University of Basel and the University of Heidelberg. He worked as a conductor and répétiteur at the Curtis Institute of Music, the Aspen Music Festival and School and holds a Master of Arts in Composition from the University of California, Berkeley.

From 1973 to 1987 he was a member of the board of the City of Basel Music Academy and from 1987 to 1999 director of the Conservatory of Lucerne. From 1999 to 2001 he was founding rector of the Lucerne College of Music. From 2000 to 2006 he was a board member of the Association Européenne des Conservatoire. He is a member of the research council of the Swiss National Science Foundation.

From 1984 to 1990 he was president of the Jeunesses Musicales de Suisse.

Bräm was from 1987 to 2006 chief conductor of the Junge Philharmonie Zentralschweiz. He is head of the Regio choir Binningen/Basel, and a regular guest conductor of the Chamber Philharmonic Pardubice. He gave master classes in the Czech Republic, Slovakia and Argentina.

He is a jury member of the Concours de Musique du Festival de Fribourg and the Sacred Johannes Brahms Chamber Music Competition of the Music Academy in Gdansk.

Bräm was influenced by composers such as Anton Webern, Pierre Boulez and John Cage.

He composed more than 100 works. Among his most famous compositions include the Angelus Silesius cantata, the Requiem for CS and Litteri un Schattä - Luci e ombre. As a guest composer, he worked variously at the Hokuto International Music Festival and with the Swiss Groupe Lacroix and the German Ensemble Sortisatio on a CD called 8 Pieces on Paul Klee in honor to the painter Paul Klee.
