= Günter Neubert =

German composer and sound engineer

- Born: 11 March 1936; Crimmitschau, Saxony, Germany
- Died: 18 November 2021 (aged 85); Leipzig, Saxony, Germany
- Occupations: composer and sound engineer

Günter Neubert (11 March 1936 – 18 November 2021) was a German composer and tonmeister.

== Life ==
Born in Crimmitschau, Saxony, after his Abitur at a secondary school in Crimmitschau in 1954, Neubert studied school music at the University of Music and Theatre Leipzig from 1954 to 1955 and from 1955 to 1960 sound engineering at the Hochschule für Musik "Hanns Eisler". He completed his studies in 1960 with the Staatsexamen and diploma. From 1959 to 1965 he was a guest auditor with Rudolf Wagner-Régeny. From 1965 to 1967 he was its aspirant and acquired the teaching qualification for music theory at the Berlin Musikhochschule. From 1968 to 1971 he was Meisterschüler for musical composition with Wagner-Régeny and Paul Dessau at the Academy of Arts, Berlin.

From 1960 to 1961, Neubert was assistant Tonmeister at the Rundfunk der DDR in Berlin. From 1961 to 1991 he worked as sound director at the radio station in Leipzig. From 1978 to 1989 and from 1999 to 2006 he was Lecturer at the Leipzig Academy of Music. From 1978 to 1989 he was also a lecturer at the Hochschule für Musik Carl Maria von Weber. In 1987 he became private docent. In 1990 he became a member of the board of the Sächsischer Musikbund, which he headed from 1998 to 2000. Finally he worked as a sound engineer at the Mitteldeutscher Rundfunk from 1992 to 2000.

From 1992 to 1995 he was a member of the board of directors of the Deutscher Komponistenverband. Here he directed the series Das Außergewöhnliche Konzert and created the Förderpreis für junge Komponisten und Musikwissenschaftler. From 1995 to 2001 he was a member of the Sächsischer Musikrat and chairman of the Saxony regional association of the German Composers' Association. In 1996 he was a founding member of the Sächsische Akademie der Künste. Since 2009 he has been chairman of the Grieg-Begegnungsstätte Leipzig (Notenspur-Station 3 of the Unesco-Initiativen (Leipzig)). He is a member of the board of trustees of the "Hans Stieber Foundation", which regularly awards the Hans Stieber Prize. He is also on the board of trustees of the Freunde und Förderer des MDR Rundfunkchores e. V".

From 2001 to 2005 he composed an oratorio with texts by Karl May and Isaiah, which was premiered in Dresden on 22 November 2006.

== Prizes and awards ==
- 1980: Hanns Eisler Prize of the Rundfunk der DDR
- 1984: Kunstpreis der Stadt Leipzig
- 1985: Composition Prize for the International Composition Seminar of the Künstlerhaus Boswil (Switzerland) Foundation.
- 2011: 2nd prize in the composition competition for the theme year "Reformation and Music" of the Evangelische Kirche in Deutschland
- 2015: Helmut-Bräutigam-Preis der Stadt Crimmitschau

=== Chamber music ===
- 1959: Fünf Kinderstücke for piano. UA 2006 Dresden
- 1961: Kleine heitere Suite. 8 miniatures for 6 wind instruments and percussion
- 1963: Zwölf Stücke for harpsichord
- 1963: Musik für Streichquartett in 5 mouvements. UA 1997 Salzburg. Stadler Quartett
- 1964: Sonate for horn and piano. UA Peter Damm, Gunther Hauer
- 1965: Sonate for piano
- 1965: Musik für Flöte solo
- 1966: Fünf kurze Charakterstudien for piano UA 2006 Dresden
- 1968: Drei Vortragsstücke for trumpet and piano
- 1968: Musik für Bläserquintett. UA 1968 Leipzig
- 1969: Klavierstück für Wagner-Régeny. UA
- 1969: Klavierstück für Paul Dessau. UA
- 1971: Intermezzo eines Liebhabers. Capriccio for four cellos (using a theme from Der Rosenkavalier). UA 1971 Rostock
- 1973: Konzertante Kammermusik
- 1975: Kaminstück für Matthias Claudius for guitar solo
- 1978: Vier Impressionen nach Barlach for piano
- 1978: Goccia-Capriccio per flauto e chitarra. UA 1978 Leipzig
- 1979: Kammersinfonie für Nonett. UA 1981 Leipzig (Small hall of the Gewandhaus)
- 1980: Makrokosmos I (Planetariumsmusik) for 4 instruments, percussion and multi-channel. UA 1980 Schkeuditz / Leipzig. Gruppe Neue Musik Hanns Eisler
- 1982: Musikalische Essays nach Grüty. UA 1982 Berlin. Gruppe Neue Musik Hanns Eisler
- 1983: Triptychon (in memory of Max Beckmann) for English horn, viola, double bass and guitar. UA 1984 Leipzig. Leipziger Consort. Gruppe Neue Musik Hanns Eisler
- 1984: Kontraste for double bass solo. UA 1987 Leipzig
- 1984: Partita über das Da pacem for organ solo. UA 1984 Altenburg (Schlosskirche)
- 1985: Meditation über eine Tonreihe aus dem letzten Choral der Matthäus-Passion von J.S. Bach for organ solo. UA 1985 Göttingen (St. Jacobi)
- 1986: Dithyrambus for two percussionists. UA 1986 Berlin
- 1986: Kreuzspiel for harp solo
- 1986: Mors et vita. Composition for 3 sound groups and tape playback after texts by Friedrich Hölderlins. UA 1988. Gruppe Neue Musik Hanns Eisler
- 1993: Ritmo e canto. Trio pieces for flute, bassoon and harpsichord. UA 1993 Leipzig
- 1994: Wachet auf for trumpet and organ. UA 1994 Münster (Nicolai-Kirche)
- 1996: Triptychon II for English horn, bassoon, viola and guitar. UA 1996 Leipzig (Alte Handelsbörse). Ensemble Sortisatio
- 1995: Reflexionen für zwei Hörner. UA 1995 (Landestheater Altenburg)
- 1997: Schlagspieldialog. UA 1997 Leipzig (Museum der bildenden Künste)
- 2000: Silbermann-Hymnus for two organists. UA 2000 Freiberg (Petrikirche)
- 2000: Stufen zu einem königlichen Thema - Septetto super Thema Refugium. UA 2000 Leipzig (Alte Handelsbörse). Rheinisches Bach-Collegium
- 2002: Cantus e Toccata for two violins and piano. UA 2002 Bamberg (Auditorium Maximum der Universität)
- 2003: Requiem per organum (Sonata da chiesa). UA 2003 Dresden (Kreuzkirche). Martin Schmeding
- 2008: String quartet Nr. 2. UA 2008 Leipzig (Gewandhaus). Gewandhausquartett
- 2010: New Dances in mutation for woodwind quintet(2010). UA 2011 Leipzig (Gewandhaus-Bläserquintett)
- 2011: Szene für Altsaxophon und Conga (2011). UA 2012 Chemnitz
- 2011: Drei Solfeggien for flute solo. UA 2012 Rheinsberg
- 2012: Ein fröhlich Ding. Scene freely based on a poem by Friedrich von Logau for two violins with small percussion instruments
- 2015: Animal maris cantans - Der singende Fisch. Small radio play scene for piano quartet with small percussion instruments after a tale by Werner Heiduczek. UA 2016 Hoyerswerda
- 2016: Irini - Frieden for piano solo. UA 2016 Dresden

=== Orchestral work ===
- 1967: Streichermusik in three parts. UA 1969 Dresden
- 1969: Orchestermusik on a thema by Robert Schumann. UA 1971 Karl-Marx-Stadt (Opernhaus)
- 1971: Konzertante Suite for violin and small orchestra. UA 1971 Leipzig (Altes Rathaus)
- 1978: Concerto ritmico per pianoforte ed orchestra. UA 1978 Borna
- 1979: Notturno - Nachtgedanken for 19 string players. UA 1979 Eisenach (Wartburg)
- 1981: Partita for two wind choirs and orchestra. UA 1982 Frankfurt an der Oder
- 1985: Sinfonie in einem Satz (Sinfonia infernale). UA 1986 Berlin
- 1989: Orchestermusik I: Das verschenkte Weinen. UA 1990 Halle. Händelfestspielorchester Halle
- 1989: Choral-Metamorphosen zu "Sonne der Gerechtigkeit" for large orchestra. UA 1990 Leipzig (Gewandhaus)
- 1989: Orchestermusik II: Das verschenkte Weinen. UA 1993 Gera
- 1990: Konzert für Kontrabass und Orchester. UA 1996 Chemnitz (Opernhaus)
- 1997: Brücken. UA 1997 Weimar
- 2007: Fünf Kurze Charakterstücke for small string orchestra. UA 2007 Göttingen

=== Lieder / Vocal chamber music ===
- 1961: Drei Lieder for baritone and piano. Text: Jacques Prévert
- 1964: Fünf Psalmengesänge for soprano and a keyboard instrument (piano, organ)
- 1966: Zwei Lieder for soprano, piano and guitar (ad lib.). Text: Wilhelm Busch. UA 2006 Dresden
- 1967: Tag-Nacht-Gesänge for soprano and piano. Text: Hans Franck
- 1971: Variationen über ein Stücklein aus der „Musikalischen Rüstkammer“, Leipzig anno 1719, for soprano and nine instruments. UA 1971 Leipzig
- 1974: Heine-Liedsong for tenor and piano. UA 1999 Berlin
- 1987: Memento for mezzo-soprano, baritone, speaker and instrumental ensemble. Text: Friedrich Wolf. UA 1987 Berlin (Akademie der Künste). Musica-Viva-Ensemble Dresden
- 1992: Morgenlied, Abendlied for alto recorder, soprano and piano (1992). Text: Caspar David Friedrich. UA 2005 Markkleeberg
- 1993: Lass mich rühren deine Seele for baritone, flute, harp and string quartet. Text: John Gracen Brown. UA 1994 Dresden
- 1998: Zwischen den Welten. Ode an einen weit Entfernten for mezzo-soprano and chamber ensemble. UA 1998 Leipzig (Alte Handelsbörse). Annette Jahns, Musica-Viva-Ensemble Dresden
- 2006: Liebeslied for mezzo-soprano and piano. Text: Werner Heiduczek. UA 2006 Leipzig (Stadtbibliothek)
- 2006: Glockensprüche after texts of the 100th psalm for bass, tubular glockenspiel and organ. UA 2006 Leipzig-Schleußig, Bethanienkirche, Gotthold Schwarz, Johann Georg Baumgärtel, Stephan Paul Audersch
- 2010: Am offenen Fenster. Five songs for mezzo-soprano or baritone and piano. Text: Werner Heiduczek. UA 2010 Leipzig (Moritzbastei)
- 2010: Auff die Liebste. Seven songs for baritone and piano. Text: Paul Fleming. UA 2010 Dresden (Sächsische Akademie der Künste)
- 2012: Dahin. Five songs for baritone and piano. Text: Manuela Sandhop. UA 2012 Weimar

=== Choral work ===
- 1962: Benediktbeurer Liebeslieder for mixed choir a capella. Recording 1964/65 Rundfunkchor Leipzig
- 1968: Passions-Gesänge for mixed choir a capella
- 1969: Volksliedbearbeitung for three female voices, flute, oboe, clarinet, guitar (1969) 6´
- 1976: Begegnungen for two mixed choirs a capella. Text by Wolfgang Jähnig. UA 1976 Leipzig (Altes Rathaus)
- 1977: Der Wettstreit. Small cantata using the song Der Kuckuck und der Esel. UA 1977 Leipzig (Altes Rathaus)
- 1982: Drei Vogelchöre for children choir a capella. Text: Dieter Mucke, Hoffmann von Fallersleben
- 1987: Zwei Motetten for mixed choir a capella
- 1987: An die´Menschheit for eight-part choir a capella. Text: Friedrich Hölderlin. UA 1993 Hamburg. NDR-Chor
- 1991: Drei Schneiderlieder. UA 1993 Leipzig (Altes Rathaus). Children choir of the MDR
- 1991: Machet die Tore weit. Advents-Introitus for two mixed choirs and organ. UA 1991 Göttingen (St. Jacobi)
- 2001: Psalmen-Motetten for choir a capella. UA Nr. 3: 2001 Leipzig (Thomaskirche). Thomanerchor, Georg Christoph Biller (Leitung). UA komplett: 2002 Dresden (Martin-Luther-Kirche)
- 2001: Das Licht über uns. Motet for choir a capella. UA 2006 Leipzig (Thomaskirche). Thomanerchor, Georg Christoph Biller (Leitung)
- 2006: Der Herr ist mein Hirte - mein Hirte ist der Herr. Motet for two choirs a cappella. Text: Psalm 23. UA 2006 Dresden (Frauenkirche). Christfried Brödel (conductor)
- 2007: Fünf Dreistrophengesänge for children choir with small percussion. Text: Georg Maurer. UA 2007 Dresden (Dreikönigskirche). Philharmonischer Kinderchor Dresden
- 2007: Cantate Domino. Motet for double choir a capella. Text: Psalm 96. UA 2007 Dresden (Frauenkirche). Philharmonischer Kinderchor Dresden
- 2017: Wessobrunner Gebet for choir a capella. UA 2017 Stein am Rhein. Christfried Brödel (conductor)

=== Vocal Symphony ===
- 1973: An die Zukunft. Orchestral songs for baritone (or mezzo-soprano). Text: Harald Gerlach (1973). UA (world premiere) 1974 Ilmenau
- 1975: Gewaltig wie der Tod. Orchestral songs based on texts from the Bible, UA 1975 Gera
- 1983: Laudate Ninive. Oratorium, UA Göttinger Symphonie Orchester, NDR, 1983 Hannover.
- 1983: Von menschlichen Schwächen. After texts by Martin Luther, UA 1983 Dresden
- 1991: … jeder Herkunft leben. Orchestra songs after texts by Ingeborg Bachmann, UA 1991 Hannover
- 1987: Hymne an die Menschheit for solos, choir, organ and orchestra after texts by Friedrich Hölderlin, UA 1993 Hamburg as a cappella-cyclus.
- 1975: Gewaltig wie der Tod. Orchestra songs for mezzo-soprano, baritone and large orchestra. Hebrew texts, translated by Manfred Hausmann. UA 1975 Gera. Roswitha Trexler, Siegfried Lorenz
- 1980: Lessingfarben for tenor, mixed choir and orchestra. UA 1981 Dresden
- 1983: Von menschlichen Schwächen. Fünf Gesänge für Bass und Kammerorchester. Text: Martin Luther (Tischreden). UA 1983 Dresden (Gobelinsaal der Sempergalerie). Theo Adam, Kammerorchester der Deutschen Staatsoper Berlin, Hartmut Haenchen (conductor)
- 1983: Laudate Nivine. Oratorium für Bassbariton, Chor, Kinderchor und Orchester. Text: aus den Büchern Amos und Jona aus dem Gebet des Manasse. UA 1983 Hannover (NDR)
- 1988: Hymne an die Menschheit für Mezzosopran, Tenor, Bariton, Chor, Orgel und Orchester. Text: Friedrich Hölderlin (1988)
- 1989: Das neue Jahrhundert. Songs for baritone and orchestra. Lyrics: Friedrich Gottlieb Klopstock (1989). UA 1990 Dresden. Jürgen Kurth, Dresdner Philharmonie, Jörg-Peter Weigle (conductor)
- 1991: …jeder Herkunft zu leben. Songs for baritone and orchestra. Lyrics: Ingeborg Bachmann. UA 1991 Hannover (Niedersächsisches Staatstheater) Hannover. Wolfgang Hellmich, Niedersächsisches Staatsorchester, George Alexander Albrecht (conducting)
- 2005: Animal maris cantans - Der singende Fisch. Musical allegory for speaker, children choir (with percussion instruments) and orchestra. Text: Werner Heiduczek. UA 2005 Dresden (Kulturpalast), Dresdner Philharmonie
- 2005: Wo der Herr nicht das Haus baut. Oratorio for alto, bass, speaker, choir and orchestra. Text: Isaiah, Psalm 127, Karl May. UA 2006 Dresden (Martin-Luther-Kirche). Sinfonietta Dresden
- 2008: Da Pacem, Domine. Oratorio for the Peace of Westphalia, for soprano, bass, speaker, choir, organ and small orchestra. UA 2008 Münster (Lambertikirche)
- 2011: Choral-Kantate: Ein feste Burg ist unser Gott for mezzo-soprano, bass-baritone, mixed choir and instrumental ensemble. UA 2017 Münster (Erlöserkirche)
- 2019: Glockenweihemusik for brass instruments, timpani and bells. UA 2019 Leipzig (Nikolaikirche). Christfried Brödel (conductor)

=== Stage work ===
- 1974: Weihnachtsgans Auguste. Musical fairy tale for bass buffo, two female speakers, children's choir and small orchestra. Libretto: Kurt Steiniger (after Friedrich Wolf). UA 1974 Nordhausen (Theater Nordhausen/Loh-Orchester Sondershausen)
- 1983: Das verschenkte Weinen. Ballet in 11 scenes. UA 1990 Halle (Theater des Friedens). Händelfestspielorchester Halle
- 1990–1995: Persephone oder Der Ausgleich der Welten. Opera in 4 acts. Libretto: Carl Ceiss (after Werner Heiduczek). UA 2001 Leipzig (Leipzig Opera). Gewandhausorchester, Johannes Kalitzke (conductor)

=== Radio music ===
- 1969: Franz Freitag: Der Egoist. Director: Gert Andreae (radio play, Rundfunk der DDR)
- 1970: William Shakespeare: Othello. Director: Gert Andreae (radio play, Rundfunk der DDR)
- 1971: Charles De Coster: Grietje heiratet. Adaptation: Gudrun Mogel, director Günter Bormann (radio play, Rundfunk der DDR)
- 1985: Gerhart Hauptmann: Vor Sonnenuntergang. Adaptation: Ulrich Griebel, director Walter Niklaus (radio play, Rundfunk der DDR)

== Literature ==
- Neubert, Günter. In Wilfried W. Bruchhäuser: Komponisten der Gegenwart im Deutschen Komponisten-Interessenverband. Ein Handbuch. 4th edition. Deutscher Komponisten-Interessenverband, Berlin 1995, ISBN 3-555-61410-X, p. 917.
- Neubert, Günter. In Paul Frank, Wilhelm Altmann: Kurzgefaßtes Tonkünstlerlexikon. Second part: Ergänzungen und Erweiterungen seit 1937. Volume 1, Heinrichshofen. 15th edition. Wilhelmshaven 1974, ISBN 3-7959-0087-5, p. 125.
- Udo Klement: Gedenkmusiken von Reiner Bredemeyer, Helge Jung, Ernst Hermann Meyer und Günter Neubert. In Positionen 2, 1988, pp. 13–14.
- Günter Neubert. In Peter Hollfelder: Geschichte der Klaviermusik. Volume 1. Noetzel, Wilhelmshaven 1989, ISBN 3-7959-0436-6, pp. 327–328.
- Ulrike Liedtke: Günter Neubert. In Komponisten der Gegenwart (KDG). Edition Text & Kritik, Munich 1996, ISBN 978-3-86916-164-8.
