= Thomas Böttger =

German composer and pianist

Thomas Böttger (born 1957 in Neustrelitz, Bezirk Neubrandenburg) is a German composer and pianist.

== Life ==
From 1975 to 1980, Böttger studied composition and piano at the Berlin College of Music "Hanns Eisler". From 1980 to 1981, he studied with Tadeusz Baird at the Fryderyk Chopin Music Academy in Warsaw. From 1981 to 1983, he was a master's student of Ruth Zechlin at the Academy of the Arts, Berlin. In 1983 his composition Rilke-Lieder was first performed at the Warsaw Autumn. Since 1986 he lives in Hamburg and he currently works for the North German Broadcasting. Between 1999 and 2001 he created more than 200 programs about piano music. As a pianist he performed in many European countries (e.g. Kuhmo Chamber Music Festival in Finland, Assisi-Festival in Italy and Kodály-Festival in Hungary). His work includes commissioned compositions by the Berlin State Opera, the broadcasting corporation of the GDR and the Palace of the Republic. He worked together with Miklós Perényi, the Wooden Art Duo, the Ensemble Integrales, John-Edward Kelly, the Ensemble Sortisatio and Michael Massong. He wrote a book about Tamás Vásáry in 2005. In 2008 he served as a jury member at the Richter International Piano Competition in Moscow.

== Awards ==
- 1978: Hanns Eisler Prize
- 1987: Gerhard Maasz Prize
