= Michael Stöckigt =

German composer and pianist

Michael Stöckigt (born 1957) is a German composer and pianist. His father is the East German pianist Siegfried Stöckigt. In 1973 Michael Stöckigt became a master student in composition of Günter Kochan at the Berlin College of Music "Hanns Eisler". He was awarded in Australia, Austria (International Composition Competition, 1981) and Italy. Today he is a docent in Berlin and at the University of Music and Theatre in Rostock. As a pianist he performed in France, Syria and the Netherlands. He composes for musicians such as the Ensemble Sortisatio.
