= Thomas Buchholz =

German composer and music educator

Thomas Walter Buchholz (born 27 August 1961) is a German composer and music educator.

== Life ==
Buchholz was born in 1961 in Eisenach as the son of the oratorio singer and vocal pedagogue Kurt Wichmann and the concert pianist and music teacher Jutta Buchholz née Gensty. His father was editor of the vocal school of Pier Francesco Tosi. Buchholz went to school in Eisenach and from the age of six years he received lessons in singing, piano, organ and music theory at the Eisenacher Musikschule. Afterwards he trained as a piano maker at the Pianofortefabrik in Leipzig. Afterwards he worked as piano tuner in Eisenach and as musical instrument restorer at the Michaelstein Abbey in Blankenburg.

From 1983 to 1988 Buchholz studied singing with Rudi Ploß, musical composition with Günter Neubert and music education with Hans-Georg Mehlhorn at the University of Music and Theatre Leipzig. From 1988 to 1992 he was Meisterschuler for composition with Ruth Zechlin at the Academy of Arts, Berlin. He also took composition courses with Rudolf Kelterborn, Witold Lutosławski and John Cage.

From 1988 to 1992 he was assistant for music theory at the Martin Luther University of Halle-Wittenberg. He taught instrumentation, counterpoint and new music. From 1993 to 1995 he was research fellow at the Heinrich Schütz House, Bad Köstritz. There he did research on Georg Benda and historical music. Afterwards he worked at the Handel House in Halle until 1999 and was engaged in regional music history. In the same year he was appointed visiting professor for composition at the Komitas State Conservatory of Yerevan in Armenia. He has also taught Ensemble conducting at the Leipzig Musikhochschule and at the BIP-Kreativitätszentrum in Leipzig and teaches in the composer class of Saxony/Anhalt. From 2011 to 2018 he was choir and orchestra conductor and teacher for music theory at the free Waldorfschule in Halle. Since 2018 he has been working as a pedagogical assistant at the IWK Institute for Further Education in Saxony-Anhalt.

Since 1996 Buchholtz has been chairman of the Landesverband Sachsen-Anhalt Deutscher Komponisten (LVDK). From 1999 to 2003 he was also president of the Ständigen Konferenz Zeitgenössische Musik in Mitteldeutschland. Buchholz is a member of the board of the German Composers' Association (DKV) Saxony/Saxony-Anhalt. Furthermore, he was artistic director of the Hallische Musiktage from 1996 to 2012. From 2010 to 2014 Buchholz was head of the jury of the International Komitas Festival at Schloss Prötzel. He was also a jury member at the composition competition for the Händel-Förderpreis der Stadt Halle, Hans-Stieber Prize, International Guitar Competition Berlin and the Composition Prize of the City of Leipzig.

His approximately 170 works (published by Schott Music and Verlag Neue Musik in Berlin) have been performed in 16 European countries, Japan and the USA. He has made CD and radio recordings, also as harpsichordist and organist. He has worked with Reinbert Evers, Howard Arman, Thomas Blumenthal, Matthias Sannemüller, John Holloway, Thomas Müller, Georg Christoph Biller, Christfried Brödel, Clemens Flämig, Martin Schmeding and Carin Levine. Buchholz gave workshops on new music in Ufa, Yerevan, Bern, Brno, Vilnius, Riga, Prague and St. Petersburg.

== Work ==
Since his youth, Buchholz has been occupied with Neue Musik. These include his compositions Eruption (1990/91), String Quartet (1988) and Two Rhapsodies (1990). In his first chamber symphony Eruption, he included sonoristic and pointillistic elements. Later he used styles of renaissance music and baroque music. He composed the chamber symphonies Perotinus (1994) and Ellipse (1995) and the cycle for chamber orchestra Five Baroque Etudes (1998/99). His orchestral music includes several major works, including Wintermusik I (2004), Die Stadt (2006), Tod des Odysseus nach einem Text von Heiner Müller (2009), Fraktale (2010), The Young Person's Guide to New Music (2010), Klingelfranz (2011) and Gegen-Impuls (2013). One focus of his work is choral music. The major choral cycles include Orplid (1998), Armenia clamans (1999), Letare Germania (2006), Luther-Arkaden (2008), Novalis Madrigal (2010) and Nongenti (2015/16). Buchholz combines contemporary compositional techniques with tonal cells into a unity in which he breaks through classical settings as well as complex avant-garde structures. Examples are Les dances imaginaire for two orchestras (2008) and Armenian Hymns for alto solo, 2 oboes and choir (2013). The chamber music comprises about 70 works, including cyclical compositions such as domino per due pianoforti (1992), Trois Airs Baroques (1998/99), Fourteen States to Bach (1999), RICERCAR and CHORAL (1999/2000), UNDEUTschLICHt - eleven caricatures for two harps (2003), KRUNK for string quartet (2005) and Tetraktys (2009). In total, the German National Library registers over one hundred published works.

== Prizes and scholarships ==
- Kompositionsstipendium der Stiftung Kulturfonds der neuen Bundesländer (1992, 1994, 1998, 2003)
- Forum Junger Komponisten (1994)
- Aufenthaltsstipendium im Künstlerhaus Schloss Wiepersdorf (1996)
- Kompositionsstipendium der Stiftung Kulturfonds Sachsen-Anhalt (1998, 2000, 2005)
- 1. Preis beim Kompositionswettbewerb zum Themenjahr "Reformation und Musik" of the Evangelische Kirche in Deutschland (2012)

== Discography ==
- 1996: Lutherarkaden
- 1998: Kammersinfonien VI – IX (Thorofon)
- 1999: Eruption
- 2000: Liebsame Beschäftigung (Kreuzberg Records)
- 2001: Musik in Deutschland 1950–20ff
- 2004: Nostradamus I (Stylton)
- 2007: Neue Musik für Streichorchester im Händelhaus, Halle/Saale
- 2008: Sonnengesänge (MDG)
- 2008: Alle Jahre wieder
- 2010: UNDEUTschLICHt – zyklen für ensembles (Kreuzberg Records)
- 2011: Momentaufnahme 20 Jahre (Kreuzberg Records)
- 2011: Komponisten aus Sachsen-Anhalt, Vol. 3
- 2011: Ehre sei Gott für alles (Querstand)

== Writings ==
- Schöpferischer Umgang mit musikalisch-historischen Quellen. Bemerkungen zu meiner Kammersinfonie vii Ex-sequi (1995). In Ingeborg Stein (ed.): Diesseits- und Jenseitsvorstellungen im 17. Jahrhundert. Interdisziplinäres Kolloquium vom 3.–5.2.1995. Quartus-Verlag, Jena 1996, ISBN 3-931505-14-6, pp. 276–284. (Sonderreihe Monographien, vol. 4)
- Rezeption von Musik der Schützzeit in Kompositionen des 20. Jahrhunderts. In Ingeborg Stein (ed.): Rezeption alter Musik. Protokollband. Kolloquium anläßlich des 325. Todestages von Heinrich Schütz. Forschungs- und Gedenkstätte Heinrich-Schütz-Haus, Bad Köstritz 1999, ISBN 3-9806208-3-2, pp. 153–170. (Sonderreihe Monographien, vol. 6)
- Einige Abstraktionsgestalten barocker Strukturelemente in Kompositionen des 20. Jahrhunderts. In Beiträge der Kolloquien 1998–2001. Forschungs- und Gedenkstätte Heinrich-Schütz-Haus, Bad Köstritz 2002, ISBN 3-9806208-4-0, pp. 81–88. (Beiträge zur musikalischen Quellenforschung, vol. 5)

== Literature ==
- Buchholz, Thomas. In Wilfried W. Bruchhäuser: Komponisten der Gegenwart im Deutschen Komponisten-Interessenverband. Ein Handbuch. 4th edition Deutscher Komponisten-Interessenverband, Berlin 1995, ISBN 3-55561-410-X, p. 157.
- Gert Richter: Thomas Buchholz. In Komponisten der Gegenwart (KDG). Edition Text & Kritik, Munich 1996, ISBN 978-3-86916-164-8.
- Buchholz, Thomas. In Axel Schniederjürgen (ed.): Kürschners Musiker-Handbuch. Axel Schniederjürgen 5th edition, Saur Verlag, Munich 2006, ISBN 3-598-24212-3, p. 59.
- Christoph Sramek: Buchholz, Thomas. In Ludwig Finscher (ed.): Die Musik in Geschichte und Gegenwart (MGG). Supplement, Bärenreiter, Kassel [among others] 2008, pp. 77–79.
- Christoph Sramek: Thomas Buchholz. Skizzenblätter zu Leben und Werk des halleschen Komponisten. Verlag Neue Musik, Berlin 2011, ISBN 978-3-7333-0809-4.
