= Horst Sannemüller =

German violinist and concertmaster

Horst Sannemüller (25 March 1918 – 12 September 2001) was a German violinist and concertmaster.

== Biography ==
Born in Heilbad Heiligenstadt, Sannemüller grew up in Stralsund. After graduating from high school he studied violin with Max Strub at the Berlin University of the Arts. During the Second World War he was drafted into the Reich Labour Service and the Wehrmacht. He also studied with Wilhelm Stross in Munich, Jacques Thibaud and Gabriel Bouillon in Paris. He remained a prisoner of war in Belgium until 1946.

After stays in Hamburg and Leipzig he became a member of the Leipzig Gewandhaus Orchestra in 1948 and later its concertmaster. He was also a member of the Gewandhaus Quartet and founder of the Leipziger Kammerorchesters. He was also a lecturer at the Hochschule für Musik Franz Liszt, Weimar and Leipzig.

The musicologist Gerd Sannemüller, who often accompanied him at the piano, was his brother. He was married to the singer Philine Fischer. His children are also musicians, so the viola player Matthias Sannemüller within the MDR Leipzig Radio Symphony Orchestra.

Sannemüller died in Hannover on 12 September 2001 at the age of 83.

== Bibliography ==
- Hans-Rainer Jung, Claudius Böhm: Das Gewandhaus-Orchester. Seine Mitglieder und seine Geschichte seit 1743. Faber & Faber, Leipzig 2006, ISBN 3-936618-86-0, p. 246
- Werner Schwarz: Pommersche Musikgeschichte. Historischer Überblick und Lebensbilder. Böhlau Verlag, Köln 1988, ISBN 3-412-04382-6, p. 212.
