= Rita Wolfensberger =

Swiss classical pianist (1928–2020)

Rita Wolfensberger (28 May 1928 – 22 February 2020) was a Swiss pianist, music educator and music critic.

== Life ==
Born in Schaffhausen, Wolfensberger studied piano with Elsa Burkhard at the Zurich University of the Arts. Afterwards, she completed the Diplôme de Virtuosité at the École Normale de Musique de Paris and attended master classes at the Accademia Musicale Chigiana in Siena. In addition, she studied piano with Guido Agosti and Anna Hirzel-Langenhan as well as harpsichord with Barbara Vignanelli at the Accademia Nazionale di Santa Cecilia in Rome.

As a soloist Wolfensberger performed in Switzerland as well as in Italy and France. She played in the "Trio Motawo", Duo Wolfensberger (with her sister) and Trio Klemm.

Wolfensberger was a reviewer at the Schaffhauser Nachrichten, the Neue Zürcher Zeitung and the Landbote. She worked in the Swiss Music Pedagogic Association (SMPV). From 1962 she was a member of the board of directors and from 1983 to 1987 president and head of auditing of the SMPV Schaffhausen. From 1977 to 1993 she was also a member of the board of the SMPV Schweiz. She was state expert for diploma examinations of the conservatories in Zurich, Winterthur, Bern and Schaffhausen. The forum for contemporary music (Musica Viva) was under her direction.

Since 1961 she was also a member of Zonta International.

Wolfensberger died in her native hometown at the age of 91.

== Publications ==
- Clara Haskil. Mit Beiträgen von Pierre Fournier, Ferenc Fricsay, Rafael Kubelík, Igor Markevitch, Peter Rybar. EA. Scherz, Bern 1961.
- Clara Haskil. Mit Beiträgen von Pierre Fournier, Ferenc Fricsay, Joseph Keilberth, Rafael Kubelik, Igor Markevitch, Peter Rybar. Second, revised and expanded edition, Scherz, Bern 1962.
