= Christian Münch =

German composer

Christian Münch (born 11 April 1951) is a German composer, organist, pianist and conductor.

== Life ==
Münch was born in Freiberg in 1951 in a cantor's family. With his father he learned trumpet and organ. Since his childhood he received piano and clarinet lessons at the music school in Freiberg.

From 1971 to 1976 he studied musical composition with Manfred Weiss and Wilfried Krätzschmar, conducting with Rudolf Neuhaus and piano with Günter Händel at the Hochschule für Musik Carl Maria von Weber. From 1983 to 1985 he was Meisterschüler with Georg Katzer at the Academy of Arts, Berlin. During this time he was engaged in electroacoustic music.

Subsequently Münch worked as répétiteur at the Semperoper in Dresden. He conducted the Gruppe Neue Musik Hanns Eisler, the "musica-viva-ensemble dresden" and the "Ensemble für Neue Musik Berlin" as well as a guest conductor at the Staatsoper Unter den Linden. Münch has conducted more than 100 world premieres. His compositions, including a ballet, have been performed by the Dresden Philharmonic, the Sächsische Staatskapelle Dresden and the Dresdner Kreuzchor, among others.

Münch has taught at the Dresden Academy of Music since 1976 and was honorary professor there from 2002 to 2016. He taught performance practice of Neue Musik.

In 2018 he donated his Nachlass to the music department of Saxon State and University Library Dresden.

== Awards ==
- Kritikerpreis der Stadt Berlin (1980)
- Hanns-Eisler-Preis des Deutschlandsender Kultur (1990)
- Kunstpreis der Hanna Johannes Arras Stiftung (2000)

== Compositions ==
- Flüsterstück Briefe aus dem Gefängnis für Mezzosopran, Fl, Vla, Perk (1979)
- Klaviervariationen (1980)
- The weak power, (Ballet, 1982/86)
- geträumt (1988)
- In schöner Trägheit (1989)
- Dakrion ... Dakrion (1992)
- Canto LXXVL by Ezra Pound, (Oratorium, 1994)
- Unschlüssig (conzert, 1999)
- All things lovely (Choral music, 1999)
- ein vliessende lieht miner gotheit für Solisten, Chor und Ensemble (2000)
- Jemand, Lieder nach Borges für Soli, Chor und Orchester (Oratorium, 2001)
- Gesang der Königin, Klaviertrio
- Musik für die wiederaufgebaute Dresdner Frauenkirche "als Gabe" (2006)
- glühend für Alt und Klavier (2007)
- Gesänge und Harmonien (Kammermusik, 2007)
- verstummen für 2 Vl, Vla, Vcl (2008)
- durchtanzen für Frauen- und Männerstimmen (2009)
- unmögliche Duos für Tenor, Pos, Vl, Vla, Vcl, Kb, Pn (2010)
- Klangmoment für Orgel, Perk (2010)
- die Hexe, die ich meine, lacht? für Sopran, 2 Vl, Vla, Vcl (2011)
- niemandem für 2 Klaviere, Chor und großes Orchester (2011)
- himmlisch für Celesta, Sopran solo und großes Orchester (2011)
- huldvoll gnadenreich für Soli, Chor (SATB), Kinderchor, Pn, Org und kleines Orchester (2012)
- es sind die Töne für Orgel (2013)
- Flöte und Fellinstrumente für Fl, Perk (2018)
- Flötenkonzert (vor der Verdunklung) für Fl solo, Trp, Hrn, Pos, Tb, 2 Vl, 2 Vla, 2 Vc, 2 Kb, Perk (2019)
- Frauenstimme und Trommler für Sopran, Drumset (2019)
- Traum (mit einem Text von Franz Kafka) für Kinder- oder Frauenchor, Pn, 2 Vl, 4 Perk (2019)

== Literature ==
- Münch, Christian. In Wilfried W. Bruchhäuser: Komponisten der Gegenwart im Deutschen Komponisten-Interessenverband. Ein Handbuch. 4th edition, Deutscher Komponisten-Interessenverband, Berlin 1995, ISBN 3-55561-410-X, p. 900.
- Christoph Sramek: Münch, Christian. In Grove Music Online. Oxford Music Online. 20 August 2012.
- Christoph Sramek: Christian Münch. In Komponisten der Gegenwart (KDG). Edition Text & Kritik, Munich 1996, ISBN 978-3-86916-164-8.
- Christoph Sramek: Münch, Christian. In Ludwig Finscher (ed.) Die Musik in Geschichte und Gegenwart (MGG). Supplement, Bärenreiter, Kassel [among others) 2004, pp. 585–586.
- Münch, Christian. In Axel Schniederjürgen (ed.): Kürschners Musiker-Handbuch. 5th edition, Saur Verlag, Munich 2006, ISBN 3-598-24212-3, p. 322.
- Über Münch-Aufführungen des Dresdner Kreuzchores, in Matthias Herrmann (ed.): Dresdner Kreuzchor und zeitgenössische Chormusik. Ur- und Erstaufführungen zwischen Richter und Kreile. Marburg 2017, (writings of the Dresdner Kreuzchor, vol. 2)
