= Groupe Lacroix =

Swiss-Austrian composers group

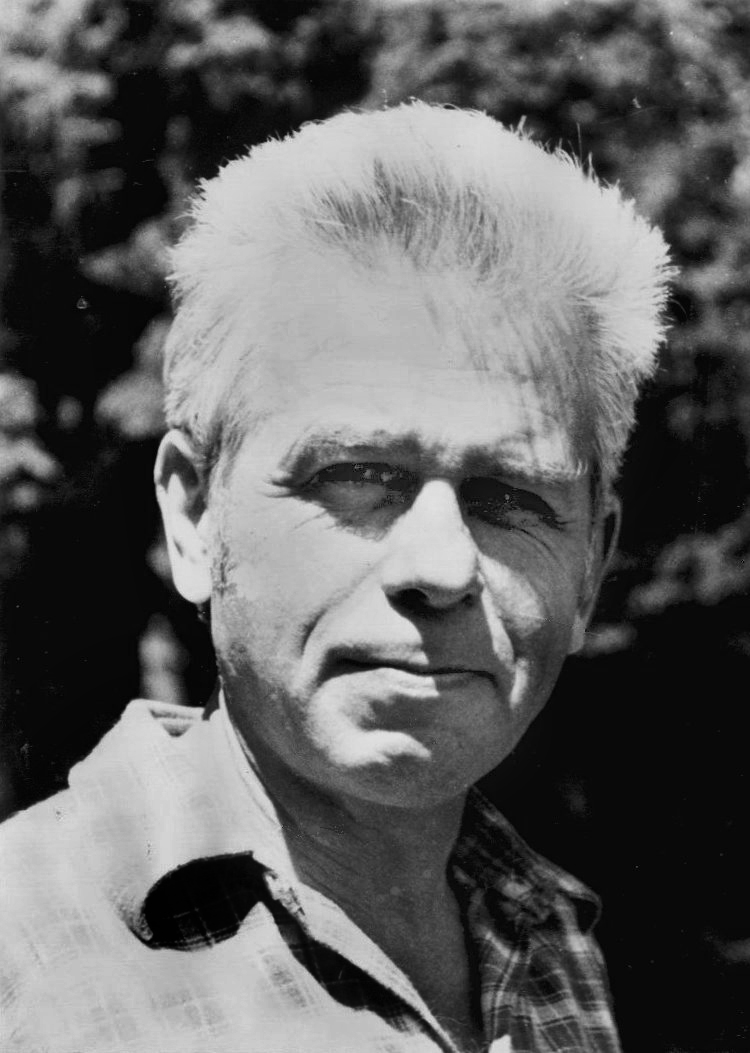
Edison Denisov

The Groupe Lacroix is a Swiss-Austrian composers ensemble.

== History ==
The formation of Groupe Lacroix originates from a joint master class visit of the founding members to the Russian avant-garde composer Edison Denisov as part of the Lucerne Festival at the Lucerne University of Applied Sciences and Arts in summer 1993.

The group was then joined in autumn 1993 by six well-known Swiss composers in the Centre musical de la Fondation Hindemith Chalet de Lacroix (today Hindemith-Musikzentrum of the Hindemith-Stiftung. Among the founding members were Michael Baumgartner (who did not become an official member), John Wolf Brennan from Lucerne, Jean-Luc Darbellay from Bern, Christian Henking from Bern, Stephan Sabotta (who did not become an official member) and Michael Schneider from Aarau.

In 1994 Marianne Schroeder from Basel, 1996 Michael Radanovics from Vienna and 2000 Alfons Karl Zwicker from St. Gallen joined. In 1999, guest composers were Marcel Wengler (Luxembourg) and in 2003 Thüring Bräm, who is also the organiser of the group. Radanowics and Brennan are specialized in Jazz. Schroeder plays the music of John Cage, Karlheinz Stockhausen, Giacinto Scelsi, Galina Ustvolskaya, among others.

The aim of the group of composers is to establish a joint dialogue. According to their own statements, the core idea is: "that the individuality of artistic expression and the exchange beyond the concert hall and the desk are not only not mutually exclusive, but can also be mutually enriching.

International cooperation took place in Lucerne in 1993, in Moscow in 1995/96 (at the Moscow Alternativa Festival), in Dublin, Blonay, Fribourg and Lucerne in 1997 and in Weggis and Leipzig in 1999] (at the MDR Musiksommer). Since the Leipzig concerts there has been an intensive cooperation in a "Klee-Project“ with the Ensemble Sortisatio.

== Discography ==
- 1997: The Composer Group with the Moscow Rachmaninov Trio (Creative Works Records)
- 1999: Arpiade with Barbara Sutter, Béatrice Wolf and Michael Wolf (edition edex)
- 2003: 8 Pieces on Paul Klee with the Ensemble Sortisatio (Creative Works Records)
