= Chan Wing-wah =

Hong Kong composer (born 1954)

- Born: 1954 (age 71–72)
- Education: Chinese University of Hong Kong
- Occupations: Conductor, composer

Chinese name
- Traditional Chinese: 陳永華
- Simplified Chinese: 陈永华
- Hanyu Pinyin: Chén Yǒnghuá
- Yale Romanization: Chàhn Wíhng-wàh
- Jyutping: Can4 Wing5waa4

Chan Wing-wah (JP (陳永華; born 1954, in Hong Kong) is a Chinese conductor and composer. He is professor of music at the Chinese University of Hong Kong and president of the Composers and Authors Society of Hong Kong. He was also chairman of the Hong Kong Composers' Guild, vice president of the Asian Composers' League and board member of the International Society for Contemporary Music (ISCM). He composed over 100 works, including eight symphonies. He was awarded several times, e.g. with the ACL Yoshiro Irino Memorial Prize, the Ten Outstanding Young Persons Award and the composition award of the International Double Reed Society in Florida.

== Life and work ==
Chan Wing-wah earned a teacher's diploma from Northcote College of Education in 1974. 1975 he graduated from the Sir Robert Black College of Education. From 1975 to 1979 he studied composition with David Gwilt at the Chinese University of Hong Kong (CUHK) and obtained a Bachelor of Arts (Music). In 1979 he received the Fellowship Diploma in Music Composition (FTCL) from Trinity College of Music in London. From 1980 to 1985 he was Commonwealth Fellow with John Beckwith at the University of Toronto (Master of Music and Doctor of Music). Sponsored by the German Academic Exchange Service in 1986, he attended the Darmstadt International Summer Courses for New Music. After his studies he decided to go back to Hong Kong.

He composed eight symphonies as well as orchestral and chamber music. His works have been performed in Australia, Asia, North America and Europe. Performers were the Kroumata Ensemble, the Ensemble Antipodes, the Fires of London ensemble, the Kronos Quartet and the Ensemble Sortisatio.

From 1993 to 2004 he was chairman of the Hong Kong Composers' Guild. From 1993 to 2009 he was honorary conductor of the Hong Kong Children's Choir. Since 2001 he has been the chairman of the Composers and Authors Society of Hong Kong. From 1995 to 2004 he was a member of the Hong Kong Arts Development Council. Since 1995 he has been the music director of the Hong Kong Oratorio Society. From 1995 to 2000 he was a board member of the Guangzhou Federation of Youths. From 1996 to 2006 he was chairman of the Hong Kong Jockey Club Music and Dance Fund. From 1997 to 2001 he was board member of the International Society for Contemporary Music and 2002 vice president of the Asian Composers' League. Since 2000 he has been an adviser to the Leisure and Cultural Services Department and since 2005 of the Hong Kong Chinese Orchestra. From 2002 to 2004 he was chairman of the Hong Kong Philharmonic Orchestra and between 1994 and 1996 its first composer in residence. From 2004 to 2005 he served on the advisory board of the Singapore Chinese Orchestra and from 2004 to 2006 of the China Broadcasting Chinese Orchestra and the Hong Kong Melody Makers. From 2005 to 2006 he was member of the West Kowloon Cultural District Consultative Committee.

Since 1986 he has taught music at the Chinese University of Hong Kong (CUHK). He became reader in 1996 and became Professor of Music in 2001 . He was Chairman of Music Department from 1992-2005 and Associate Dean of Arts 1998-2006. Prof. Chan is now Vice-President (Academic) and Director, School of Management at the Centennial College established by the University of Hong Kong (HKU), Senior Advisor at the School of Professional And Continuing Education of HKU and the adjunct professor at CUHK.

== Fraud conviction ==
Chan Wing-wah was convicted of fraud over a HK$1.9 million tenancy allowance. He was found guilty of two counts of using a document with intent to deceive and ordered by the District Court to perform 200 hours of community service. Following conviction, he was appointed Associate Dean (Education) of the School of Music, The Chinese University of Hong Kong, Shenzhen.

== Filmography ==
- 2003: Yun loi si ngoi
