= Michael Frischenschlager =

Austrian violinist (born 1935)

Michael Frischenschlager (born 31 October 1935) is an Austrian violinist.

== Life ==
Born in Salzburg, Frischenschlager studied violin with Theodor Müller, André Gertler, Franz Samohyl and Yehudi Menuhin as well as conducting and musicology in Salzburg, Cologne, Vienna and Rome.

He played with the Vienna Soloist Orchestra and the Vienna Philharmonic. Concert tours have taken him throughout Europe, to North America and Asia. Since 1971, he has been professor of violin at the University of Music and Performing Arts Vienna, of which he was rector. He acts as a jury member at music competitions like the International Violin Competition Henri Marteau. He is also president of the International Fritz Kreisler Competition. Among his students are Michael Radanovics, Mauro Iurato, Valya Dervenska and Rino Yoshimoto.

== Violin Technique Film Series ==
In 2019, Canadian violinist Christina Duncan began filming Frischenschlager's method book 'Classical Violin Technique'. The series was partially funded by a crowdfunding campaign. The campaign offered creative supporter rewards, such as violin lessons with Vienna Philharmonic Orchestra member Ekaterina Frolova. The 20 Episode film series is set to premier on YouTube in September of 2023. Alongside the violin technique demonstrational videos, Duncan produced a three part interview documentary series. The series premiered on Myfidelio ORF, in May 2023. In the episodes Frischenschlager speaks with conductor Carlo Benedetto Cimento and Austrian musicologist Rudolf Aigmüller, on Classical Music and the future of the genre. Frischenschlager was also the subject of a written Essay-Profile 'Michael Frischenschlager - A Life in the Service of Music' which was published by the University of Music and Performing Arts Vienna in 2021.

== Awards ==
- 1996: Decoration of Honour for Services to the Republic of Austria.
- 2004: Bundes-Ehrenzeichen
