= Gunter Sieberth =

German oboist

Gunter Sieberth (born in 1965) is a German oboist.

== Life ==
Sieberth comes from Meiningen in Thuringia. From 1978 to 1983 he attended the Musikgymnasium Schloss Belvedere in Weimar. Afterwards he studied at the Hochschule für Musik Franz Liszt, Weimar with Axel Schmidt, solo English horn player in the MDR Leipzig Radio Symphony Orchestra. Already during his studies Sieberth was a substitute at the Staatskapelle Weimar, in 1988 he graduated with a diploma. Since then he has been 1st solo oboist of the Jena Philharmonic. He is also a lecturer for oboe at the Musikgymnasium Schloss Belvedere (Weimar) and in the master classes of the Landesmusikakademie Sondershausen tätig.

As a chamber musician he worked with the harpist Volker Sellmann and performed with the chamber orchestra Ludwig Güttler. He is also a member of the wind quintet of the Jena Philharmonic. In 2008 he founded the Trio Saphiro together with the Frankfurt harpist Bettina Linck and the Meiningen concert soprano Anna Gann.

== Discography ==
- 2000: Orgeln in Thüringen – Jena, Volkshaus (Parzifal-Verlag)
- 2004: Oboe & Harfe / Gunter Sieberth & Volker Sellmann (Christophorus)
