= Ewald Körner =

German-Swiss clarinetist and conductor (1926–2010)

Ewald Körner (20 January 1926 – 11 September 2010) was a German-Swiss clarinetist and conductor.

== Life ==
Körner was born on 20 January 1926 in Nejdek, Czechoslovakia, in the Sudetenland region. He studied piano and clarinet at the Deutsche Musikhochschule in Prague as well as conducting with Joseph Keilberth. After military service he was clarinetist at the Theater Magdeburg from 1946 to 1948. From 1948 to 1950 he studied conducting at the Hochschule für Musik, Theater und Medien Hannover. From 1951 to 1960 he was a solo repetiteur and later second Kapellmeister at Staatstheater Braunschweig. In 1956 he founded the Jeunesses Musicales Orchestra in Braunschweig. He came to Bern in 1960 as operetta conductor and worked from 1963 to 1991 as first conductor at the Stadttheater. During this time he conducted more than 103 premieres, including that of François Pantillon's Die Richterin in 1991. Körner was a permanent guest conductor of the Slovak Philharmonic. For many years he also conducted the International Opera Studio Lausanne and the conducting course of the Hochschule der Künste Bern. His students include Ludwig Wicki, Christian Henking and Kaspar Zehnder.

Körner died on 11 September 2010 in Bern.

== Bibliography ==
- Ingrid Bigler-Marschall (2005). "Ewald Körner". In Andreas Kotte (ed.). Theaterlexikon der Schweiz / Dictionnaire du théâtre en Suisse / Dizionario Teatrale Svizzero / Lexicon da teater svizzer [Theater Dictionary of Switzerland] (in German). Vol. 2. Zürich: Chronos. p. 1022. ISBN 978-3-0340-0715-3. LCCN 2007423414. OCLC 62309181.
