= Jürg Wyttenbach =

Swiss composer (1935–2021)

- Born: 2 December 1935; Bern, Switzerland
- Died: 22 December 2021 (aged 86); Basel, Switzerland
- Occupation: Composer

Jürg Wyttenbach (2 December 1935 – 22 December 2021) was a Swiss composer, pianist, and orchestra conductor.

== Life and career ==
Wyttenbach studied at the University of the Arts Bern under Sándor Veress and subsequently at the Conservatoire de Paris alongside Yvonne Lefébure and Joseph Calvet. As a pianist, he performed with the Dresden Philharmonic, the Southwest German Radio Symphony Orchestra, the Frankfurt Radio Symphony, and the Kraków Philharmonic Orchestra. He also conducted the Ensemble Modern, the Klangforum Wien, the ensemble recherche, the International Society for Contemporary Music, and the Ensemble l'Itinéraire. He taught piano at the City of Basel Music Academy from 1967 to 2003.

He died in Basel on 22 December 2021, at the age of 86.

== Works ==
- Exécution ajournée
- Lamentoroso
- Tarantella
- Encore
- Harlekinade
- Les Divisions
- De Metalli les Prophéties de Leonardo da Vinci
