= Jean-Louis Petit (composer) =

French composer, conductor and organist

Jean-Louis Petit (born 20 August 1937) is a French composer, conductor and organist. He studied composition with Georges Moineau and organ with Arsène Muzerelle at the Conservatoire de Reims before he studied under Simone Plé-Caussade and Olivier Messiaen at the Conservatoire de Paris. He joined courses in conducting with Léon Barzin at the Schola Cantorum, Franco Ferrara in Venice, Igor Markevitch in Madrid, Monaco und Santiago, Chile and Pierre Boulez in Basel.

Petit won the Dimitris Mitropoulos Competition in New York in 1968. He founded many orchestras in France and conducted the Orchestre de Reims, with which he traveled to Belgium and Germany. They have been recorded by radio stations many times. He was guest conductor to orchestras around the world, including the Orchestre Philharmonique de Radio France, the Seoul Philharmonic Orchestra, the Monte-Carlo Philharmonic Orchestra, the Warsaw Philharmonic Orchestra, the New York Philharmonic, the Orchestra dell'Accademia Nazionale di Santa Cecilia, Symphony New Brunswick, the Orchestre de Paris and the Cairo Symphony Orchestra.

Petit signed with Decca Records in 1964 and conducted the series Collection Grand Siècle. Soloists were Jean-Claude Malgoire, Michel Portal, Olivier Alain and others. From 1972 to 1975 he was director of the Festival Estival de Paris. Petit founded the Atelier Musique in Ville-d'Avray to perform contemporary classical music. In 1979 he started the Festival de Musique Française de Ville d'Avray. One of the guests was Pierre Seghers. In 1997 his work contained more than 250 compositions.
