= Moscow Rachmaninov Trio =

The Moscow Rachmaninov Trio is a piano trio that emerged in 1994 from the Moscow Ensemble for Contemporary Music. Its members are Victor Yampolsky (piano), Mikhail Tsinman (violin) and Natalia Savinova (cello). The trio is named after the Russian composer Sergei Rachmaninoff.

== Discography ==
- Groupe Lacroix, The Composer Group, Creative Works Records 1997
- Sergei Rachmaninow, Trios, Hyperion Records 2000
- Dmitri Shostakovich: Piano Trios No. 1 & 2 / Sonata for Cello and Piano in D minor, Tudor 2006
- Franz Schubert, Piano Trios, Tudor
