= Peter Hollfelder =

German university teacher and pianist (1930–2005)

Peter Hollfelder (24 November 1930 – 6 December 2005) was a German classical pianist.

== Life ==
Born in Munich, supported by the Studienstiftung des deutschen Volkes, Hollfelder studied at the Hochschule für Musik und Theater München. His teachers were Franz Dorfmüller, Erik Then-Bergh and Friedrich Wührer. He made his debut in 1955 with the Münchner Philharmoniker. As Prize winner of the Bundesauswahl Konzerte Junger Künstler (1957/58), he went on a big tour of Germany. He found international recognition after piano recitals in the Tonhalle, Zürich and the Wigmore Hall.

In 1963, Hollfeder went to the Hochschule für Musik Würzburg, whose chair for piano he held until 1996.

Hollfelder died in Würzburg at the age of 75.

== Work ==
- Geschichte der Klaviermusik. Two volumes. Noetzel, Wilhelmshaven 1989, ISBN 978-3-7959-0435-7.
- Das große Handbuch der Klaviermusik.
- Lexikon Klaviermusik. Noetzel, Wilhelmshaven 1999, ISBN 978-3-7959-0770-9.
- Lexikon Klaviermusik. Supplement. Noetzel, Wilhelmshaven 2005, ISBN 978-3-7959-0855-3.
- Die Klaviermusik : historische Entwicklungen. Hamburg : Nikol Verl.-Ges., 1999, ISBN 978-3-9332-0312-0
- Auftragsnetze. Munich: Siemens, 1973.
