= MDR Musiksommer =

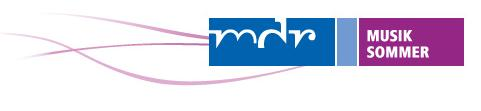
Logo of MDR Musiksommer

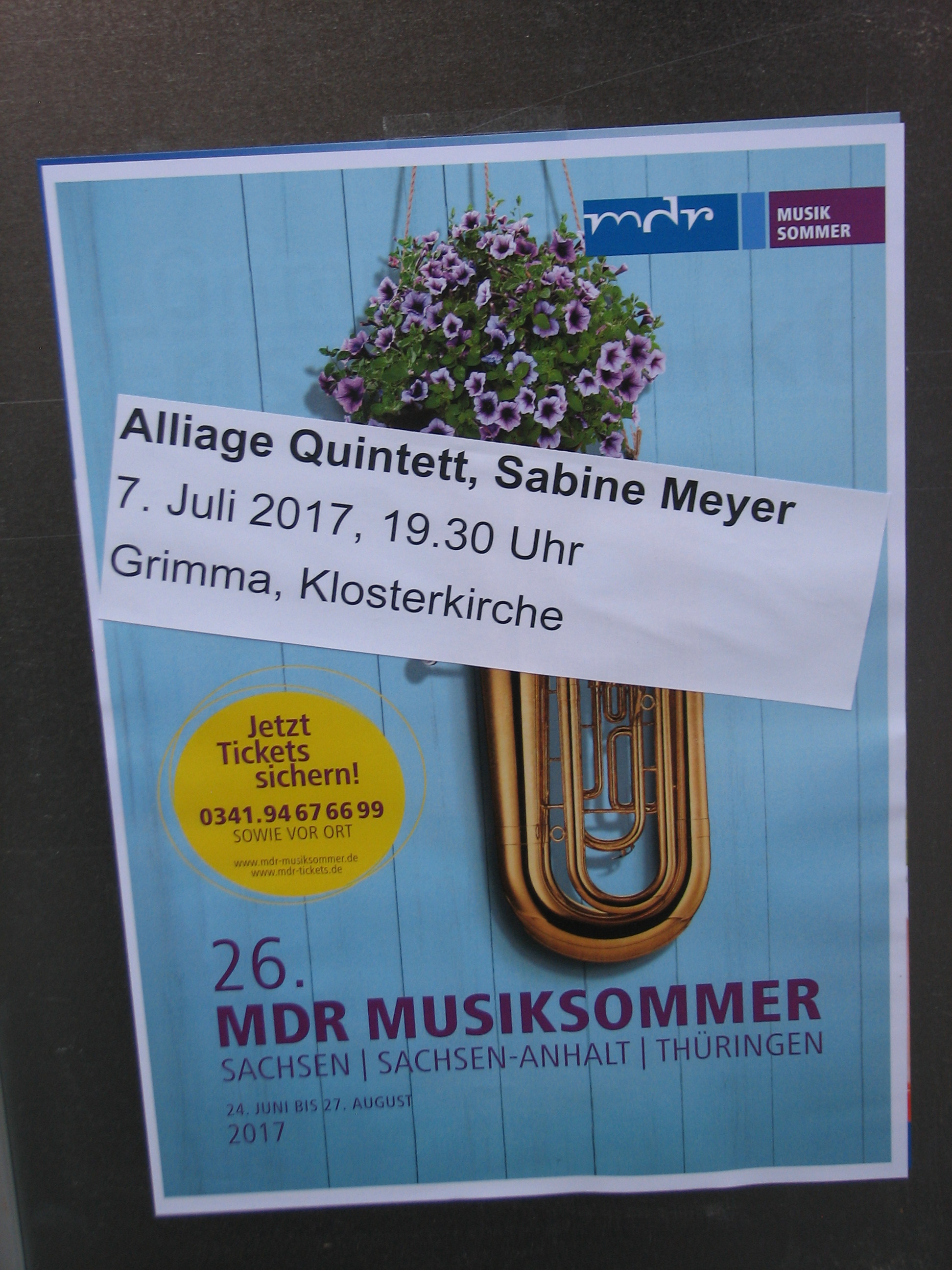
MDR Musiksommer at Klosterkirche in Grimma, Saxony (July 2017)

The MDR Musiksommer is a music festival involving three federal states of Germany: Saxony, Saxony-Anhalt, and Thuringia. It started in 1992 with 15 concerts, but grew to more than 104 concerts. The festival is held in July and attracts international stars, artists, and ensembles, as well as tourists—16,000 to 30,000 people annually. Music performed varies from periods of classical music from baroque to modern, but increasingly with cross-over artists and jazz and folk elements. Some classical artists have used the event to premiere new works.

== See also ==
- MDR Symphony Orchestra
