= Thomas Müller (composer) =

Alfred Thomas Müller (born 12 January 1939 in Leipzig) is a German conductor, composer and pianist. He won the 1988 Handel Prize presented by the city of Halle.

== Works ==
=== Orchestra and chamber ensemble ===
- flares (1979/80)
- picture for orchestra (1983/84)
- Spuren (1986)
- Epiphanie (1993/94)
- Entasis II (2001)
- Scheidt-Adaptionen (1991)

=== Solo instrument with orchestra ===
- Konzert für Klavier und Kammerorchester (1984)

=== Choir ===
- Motette (2003)

=== Organ ===
- Credo quia absurdum (1991)

=== Chamber music ===
- Streichquartett Nr. 1 (1973/74)
- Streichquartett Nr. 2 (1976/77)
- Konzentrationen (1981)
- Einblicke – Ausblicke (1982)
- Proteus (1985)
- Maqam (1987)
- Kalamos (1990)
- Drei Fragmente (1975/1993)
- Streichquartett Nr. 3 (1993)
- Ataraxia (1997/98)
- Entasis I (2000)
- Der Himmer berührt die Erde (2002)

=== Solo instruments ===
- Profile (1978)
- Solo mit Händel (1986)
- Die Posaunen der sieben Engel (1987)
- Vibrationen (1987)
- tuba sola (1989)
- Anamesis (1990)
- Correspondance (1992)
- Calls (1992)
- Fatum (1995)
- Paian (1996)
- Vier Gesänge nach Rimbaud (1981)
- Altjapanische Gesänge (1995/96)
- Canticum cecebratio (1994)
- DEUTSCHLAND – Ein Wintermärchen (1995)
- Hommage a la Femme (2002)

== Notes ==
=== Sources ===
- Deutsche Orchestervereinigung (2000). Das Orchester (in German). Deutsche Orchestervereinigung.
- Stöck, G. (2008). Neue Musik in den Bezirken Halle und Magdeburg zur Zeit der DDR: Kompositionen, Politik, Institutionen (in German). Gudrun Schröder. ISBN 978-3-926196-50-7.

=== Further reading ===
- Stefan Amzoll: Alfred Thomas Müller. In Komponisten der Gegenwart (KDG). Edition Text & Kritik, Munich 1996, ISBN 978-3-86916-164-8.
- Müller, Thomas. In Wilfried W. Bruchhäuser: Komponisten der Gegenwart im Deutschen Komponisten-Interessenverband. Ein Handbuch. 4th edition, Deutscher Komponisten-Interessenverband, Berlin 1995, ISBN 3-55561-410-X, p. 889.
