= Jean-Luc Darbellay =

Jean-Luc Darbellay (born 2 July 1946) is a Swiss composer, conductor, clarinetist and physician. He was chairman of the Swiss Society for New Music and board member of the International Society for Contemporary Music. Darbellay is a member of the composers group: Groupe Lacroix. He has published about 150 works. He was awarded with the French Ordre des Arts et des Lettres.

== Life and work ==
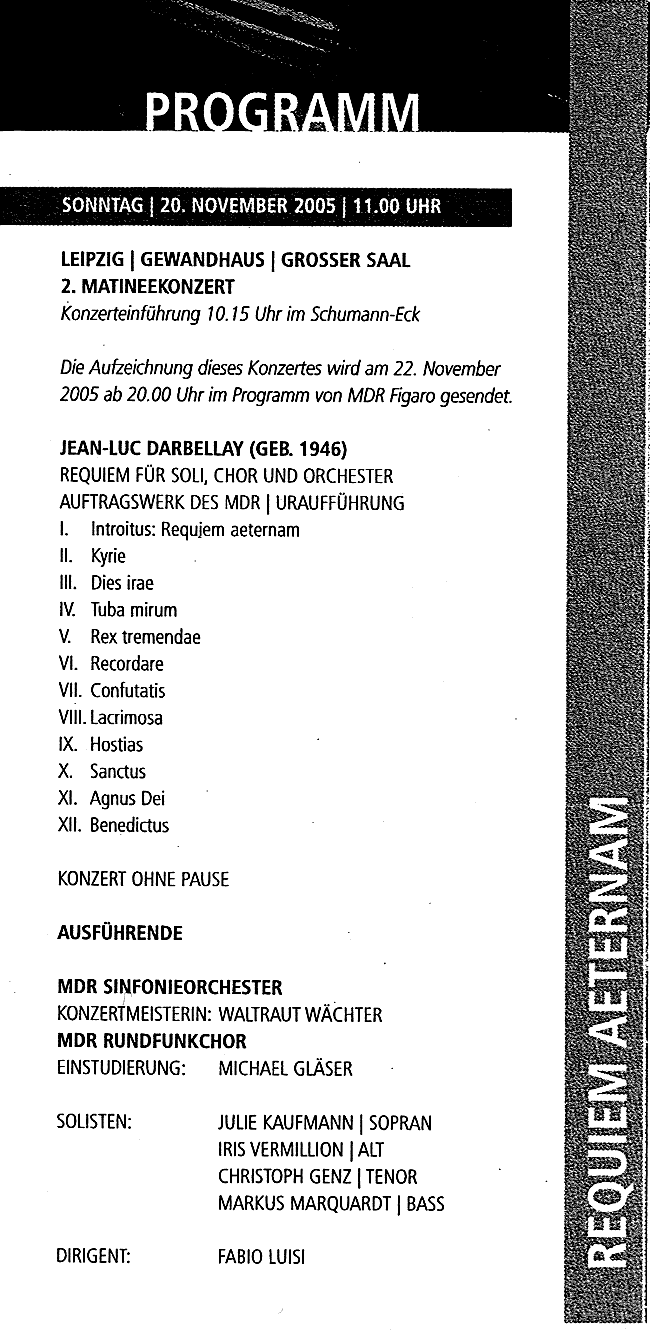
Cast list from Requiem (2005)

Darbellay was born in Bern. Like his father and brother, he first studied medicine at the University of Bern.

In 1975 he studied the clarinet with Kurt Weber at the Bern Conservatory and musical composition with Theo Hirsbrunner, Cristobal Halffter and Dimitri Terzakis. He attended seminars with Pierre Boulez (IRCM and Collège de France) and Franco Ferrara and masterclasses with Heinz Holliger and Klaus Huber. He was assistant of Edison Denisov at the Lucerne Festival. At a festival in Perugia he met John Cage, who visited Europe the last time before his death in 1992. He studied conducting with Pierre Dervaux, Paul Theissen and Jean-Marie Auberson as well.

The cellist Anssi Karttunen first premiered his Concerto for violin and cello at the Maison de Radio France in 1989. He composed Ecume for string quartet for the Radio Suisse Romande and Radio Canada. For the Central German Broadcasting (MDR) (the occasion was the 70th anniversary of Bauhaus in Dessau) he composed A Garden for Orpheus for horn, basset horn and strings. The Nouvel Ensemble Contemporain Chandigarh premiered his work for 17 instruments and megaliths – Lutéce for horn.

Under the direction of Fabio Luisi, the commission of the Radio Suisse Romande Oyama for orchestra was presented by the Orchestre de la Suisse Romande in 2000. It was live broadcast in the western Swiss television. Later performances followed in Weimar and Leipzig Gewandhaus with the MDR Symphony Orchestra under Fabio Luisi. There were broadcasts in France Musique. The piece was presented to the International Rostrum of Composers of the UNESCO in Paris.

Darbellay worked closely with Siegfried Palm. Their first encounter occurred at a course of György Kurtág in Bern. Palm composed a piece for two pianos and two basset horn that Darbellay arranged in 1991 at the Witten Days for new chamber music.

His music has already been included in many international contemporary music festivals like the Festival Alternativa (Moscow), the Festival Presences (Paris) of Radio France, the Pan Music Festival (Seoul) and several World Music Days (Bucharest, 1999, Luxembourg 2000, Hong Kong in 2002 and 2007 and Ljubljana 2003) of the International Society for Contemporary Music.

In 1978 Darbellay founded the Ludus Ensemble, whose conductor he is. Together with other composers he founded the Festival L'art pour l'Aar and the Groupe Lacroix. From 1994 to 2007 he was chairman of the Swiss Society for New Music. Tours have taken him through Europe, the United States, Canada, South America, Asia and Australia. He composed 150 works, including a chamber opera.

There are recordings with the Stuttgart Radio Symphony Orchestra, the MDR Symphony Orchestra under Fabio Luisi (including Leipzig Horn Quartet, Ensemble Sortisatio, Leipzig Percussion Ensemble), the Moscow Philharmonic Orchestra, the Orchestra della Svizzera Italiana, the Bern Symphony Orchestra and the Kammerorchester Basel. Most of his works are published at Edition Modern and G. Ricordi.

== Awards ==
- 2005: Ordre des Arts et des Lettres
