= Creative Works Records =

Creative Works Records is an independent Swiss record label.

== History ==
The label Creative Works Records was founded in 1983 by Mike Wider in Root (canton of Lucerne). Wider, who at that time had helped build up a recording studio in Lucerne and was active as a music producer, recorded the American alto saxophonist Marion Brown on his first album. With the solo LP he then travelled to record stores and also to a trade fair in Paris, where he was personally welcomed by the French Minister of Culture Jack Lang for his commitment.

Since then the label has released between two and four productions a year. In particular modern and contemporary jazz and avant-garde music are released. The label is run by Wider on a part-time basis and is not profit-oriented: All profits made are always fully invested in the next productions.

== Concept of the label ==
Musicians released on the label include Corin Curschellas, Urs Blöchlinger, John Wolf Brennan, Christy Doran, Urs Leimgruber, Evan Parker, Alfred Harth, Marion Brown, Bernd Konrad, Peter Schärli, Ned Rothenberg, Hans Kennel, Lucas Niggli, Tscho Theissing and Franz Koglmann. Albums by the late musicians Klaus Koch and Werner Lüdi were also published by the label. Both records and DVDs have been released.

Currently the focus is on Swiss musicians of the jazz and Free improvisation scene, such as Luigi Archetti, Christy Doran and Peter A. Schmid, and the Swiss composers who work around Marianne Schroeder and Brennan in the Groupe Lacroix (for example in collaboration with the Moscow Rachmaninov Trio from Russia and the Ensemble Sortisatio from Germany). Today, it is part of the label's philosophy to "accompany a band or an artist over several years and to offer them the opportunity to introduce themselves with different projects at different intervals." Thus, the label has developed among others John Wolf Brennan's five solo albums for piano as well as his exhibition were published by the label I.N.I.T.I.A.L.S.

In doing so, the label focuses on building up the musicians over a longer period of time without restricting their artistic freedom. Quote Wider: "In certain productions I'm already involved in the creation process, but I'm not one to talk up everywhere. But it is important for me to find a personal connection to the musicians." Unlike many other labels, the rights remain with the musicians.

== Literature ==
- K. D. Zeh: 20 Jahre Creative Works Records: Wider den seichten Pop. Jazz Podium 5/2004: 28
