= State Theater of Lower Saxony North =

Theater in Wilhelmshaven

Logo of the Landesbühne

The State Theater of Lower Saxony North (LBNN) is a theater founded in 1952 and located in Wilhelmshaven. Originating from the Ostfriesische Landesbühne in Leer, it is now one of two Landesbühnes in Lower Saxony (alongside the Theater für Niedersachsen in Hildesheim). One of the special features of these theaters is that they not only provide theater art for their hometown and administrative headquarters but also a large performance area in rural areas. In the case of the Landesbühne Niedersachsen Nord, which traveled as far as the Lüneburg Heath in the 1950s, the venues initially changed every year. Today, the theater presents its productions in a region inhabited by 720,000 people, ranging from Ostfriesland to Emsland and Oldenburger Münsterland.

The Landesbühne Niedersachsen Nord employs over 100 people, including 22 actors, who enable more than 500 performances to be staged throughout the region every year. The focus is on drama and children's and youth theater.

From the very beginning, the largest cultural institute in north-western Germany has been supported by the "Zweckverband der Landesbühne Niedersachsen Nord", a special-purpose association to which the districts and towns in the region belong. Together with the state of Lower Saxony, the association grants the theater annual subsidies. The theater generates almost 30 percent of its budget itself.

== History ==
=== 1947 to 1952: From Leer to Wilhelmshaven ===
The history of the LBNN began immediately after the end of the Second World War when the predecessors of the Landesbühne, the Ostfriesische Kammerspiele founded in Leer and the Neue Bühne established on the North Sea island of Norderney, began their performances. The financially shaky theaters merged to form the "Ostfriesische Landesbühne GmbH" in Leer from June 1948, which, according to the plans of its directors, was to supply various guest venues with theatrical art from all divisions. It soon became apparent, however, that Leer had decisive disadvantages for the undertaking of a touring stage: on the one hand, the town was not central enough for the trips to the various venues, and on the other hand, the catchment area of the town itself was too small. A move to the nearby city of Wilhelmshaven, which had a rich theatrical tradition since its founding in 1869, was therefore the obvious choice.

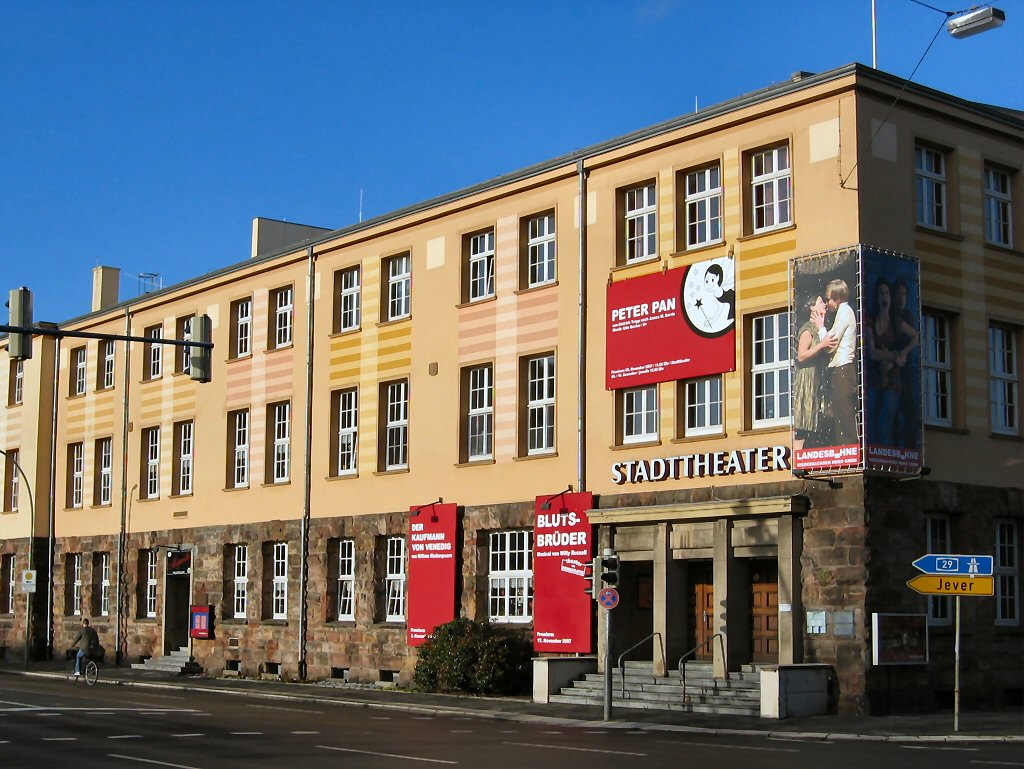
The Stadttheater Wilhelmshaven, which has been the venue and administrative headquarters of the Landesbühne Niedersachsen Nord since 1952

In the course of post-war reconstruction, a "theater construction association" was founded in Wilhelmshaven in April 1947 to promote the construction of a new theater to replace the municipal stage in the Seemannshaus, which had fallen victim to the air war in 1943. After much discussion, a new stage building was created by converting the centrally located former naval director's office from 1904. The light court of the building at the intersection of Virchowstrasse and Peterstrasse, an area measuring 13 by 31 meters, was roofed over, thus creating space for the stage and the auditorium. The former service rooms gave way to the newly created foyer and offices for the employees on two floors. The seats in the theater - 718 in the parquet and 155 in the tiers - were donated by the people of Wilhelmshaven, who expressed their support for the new cultural institution.

However, the new Stadttheater Wilhelmshaven was initially a "house without an ensemble". It was not until 1952 that the Lower Saxony Minister of Culture Richard Voigt reorganized the Ostfriesische Landesbühne into the Landesbühne Niedersachsen Nord, with its administrative headquarters in Wilhelmshaven, the municipal theater began to enjoy regular drama performances. At the same time, it was agreed that the municipal theater would also host musical productions by the Oldenburgisches Staatstheater, Low German plays by the Niederdeutsche Bühne, which had existed since 1932, and concerts by the Städtisches Orchester. In turn, the Landesbühne had to cover a large performance area from the Emsland to the Lüneburg Heath and in its first years gave guest performances in the following towns, communities, and health resorts in addition to its hometown of Wilhelmshaven: Ahmsen, Aurich, Brake, Emden, Esens, Jever, Juist, Leer, Meppen, Norden, Norderney, Oldenburg, Papenburg, Pewsum, Rotenburg/Wümme, Sögel, Soltau, Stade, Varel, Weener, Werlte, Westrhauderfehn, Wittmund and Zeven. Some of these towns later did not have their permanent theater, while others fell under the jurisdiction of the Landesbühne Hannover, which was also founded in 1952. (today: Theater für Niedersachsen, based in Hildesheim), so that the LBNN's performance area initially varied from season to season.

The "Zweckverband der Landesbühne Niedersachsen Nord" was founded in 1947 to put the Landesbühne on a solid legal and financial footing, with representatives from the kreisfreie Städte, the cities belonging to the district and the Landkreiss in the performance area. The direct organizational model for the body, which still has its headquarters in Aurich today, was an institution outside of cultural work, namely the "Zweckverband zur Kadaverververwertung in Ostfriesland". Since 1953, the association has acted as the sole shareholder of a GmbH. One of the tasks of its supervisory board is to appoint the artistic director of the Landesbühne. The members of the special-purpose association pay contributions based on their population, which, together with the subsidies from the state of Lower Saxony, form an important economic foundation for the Landesbühne.

=== 1952 to 1958: The first seasons ===
The first artistic directors of the LBNN were still working in Leer: Wilhelm Grothe and Herbert Paris. From 1952, the latter also took on the role of artistic director of the Wilhelmshaven municipal theater. This personal union - director of the Landesbühne and artistic director - was the rule in Wilhelmshaven until the mid-1990s, but there were also exceptions. Between 1958 and 1964, for example, Rudolf Sang, the former head stage manager in Oldenburg, headed the municipal theater, while Rudolf Stromberg was the artistic director of the LBNN during this period.

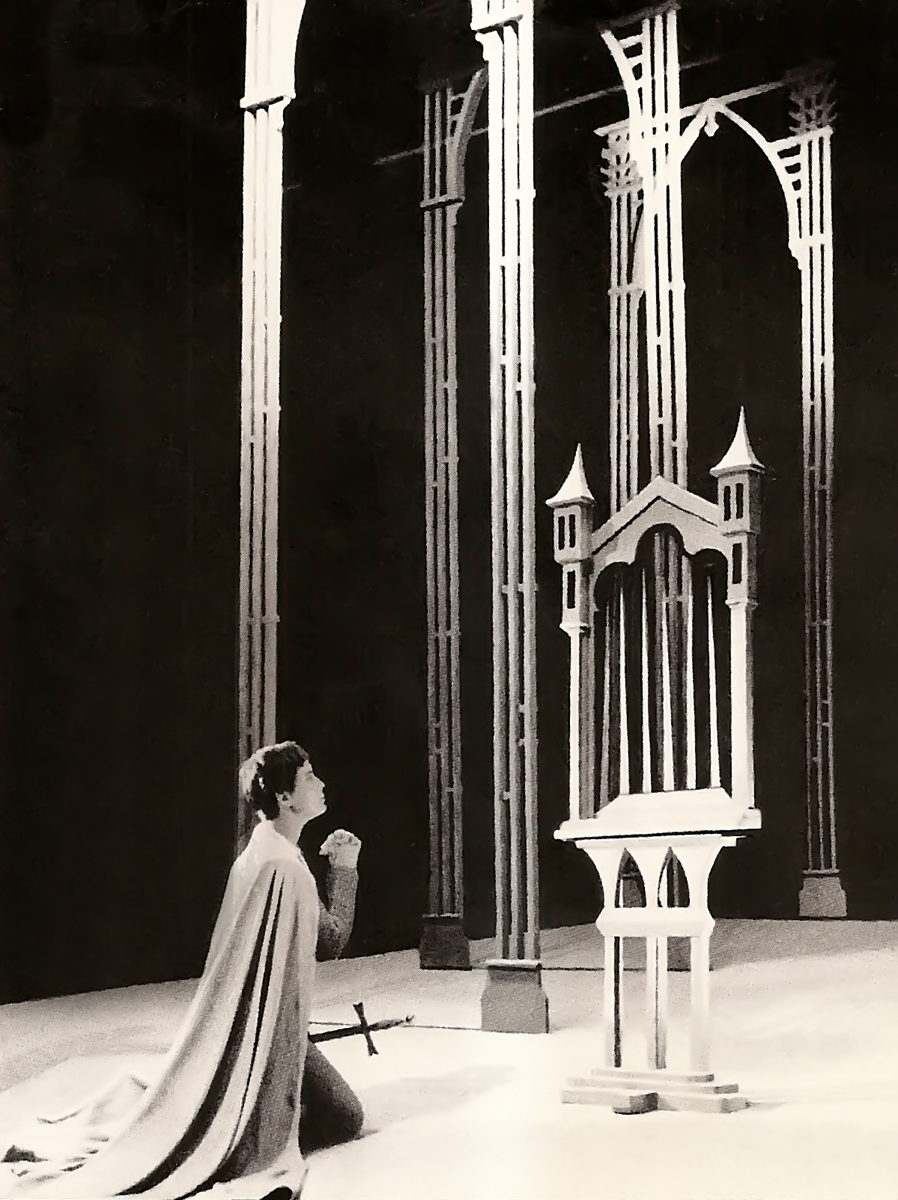
George Bernard Shaw: Die heilige Johanna, 1958/59 season, directed by Rudolf Stromberg

The first production of the Landesbühne Niedersachsen Nord, a rehearsal of Hamlet, had its premiere on 19 October 1952 in Wilhelmshaven. The title role was played that evening by guest Bernhard Minetti. In the morning of the same day, the Stadttheater was officially opened with a matinee event; the ceremonial address was given by the Berlin theater scholar Hans Knudsen. In the first seasons, performances of classics predominated. In addition to several plays by the young Schiller (The Conspiracy of Fiesco of Genoa, Don Karlos), the program included large productions that challenged a limited Ensemble such as A Winter's Tale by Shakespeare or The Knight of Zalamea by Calderón. But the modern drama of the first post-war years also found its way into the Landesbühne; Sartre's Closed Society was shown, as were Arthur Miller's plays All My Sons and Witch Hunt. The stage proved intrepid with several world premieres and the production of Rolf Honold's play Der Stoß nach Ssogrebitsche, an early examination of the war years. As a local specialty, the drama Nicht im Hause, nicht auf der Straße was performed, whose author Hans-Joachim Haecker worked as a teacher at a Wilhelmshaven grammar school. The production, which contained a procession of lamentation and thematized the protagonist's waking dreams, challenged the actors to adopt a non-mimetic style of acting and was rejected by the audience. style and was rejected by the audience. Nevertheless, the critics attested to the fact that those responsible were producing contemporary theater: "There is no longer one accusation that can be made against the Wilhelmshavener Landesbühne: Lack of willingness to experiment and failure to reflect the intellectual trends of our time."

In the summer of 1955, Herbert Paris moved to Hamburg to the Staatsoper, while Wilhelm Grothe also moved to the Hanseatic city and worked there as an actor. His successor Hermann Ludwig, who had previously directed the Volksbühne in Hanover, opened his directorship with Lessing's Nathan the Wise. He continued the work of Grothe and Paris in many respects. With View from the Bridge, for example, he presented another drama by Arthur Miller and tackled current problems. In Wilhelmshaven, Gerd Oelschlegel's play Die tödliche Lüge premiered, which sheds light on the fate of a married couple from the Soviet Occupation Zone and their attempts to gain a foothold in West German society.

=== 1958 to 1973: Rudolf Stromberg ===
Rudolf Stromberg became director of the Landesbühne in 1958. The father of the later director of the Deutsches Schauspielhaus in Hamburg, Tom Stromberg, had gained experience as an actor, dramaturge and director in Vienna, Graz, Stuttgart, Mannheim and finally Wilhelmshaven, and had also worked for a time as a theater critic. He was therefore familiar with the theater from all sides. The frequently absent Intendant Ludwig had also entrusted him with management tasks and appointed him as his successor.

From the very beginning, Stromberg was committed to improving the working conditions of the Landesbühne and its ensemble at all venues. The west wing of the Stadttheater in Wilhelmshaven was extended, creating new storage rooms, a new tailor's shop and a small rehearsal stage. However, Stromberg's name is primarily associated with a series of new auditorium buildings that were erected according to his concept at various locations in the performance area. The newly acquired performance spaces were usually located in school buildings, where they were available as auditoriums, but at the same time had to meet the requirements of theater operations (stage with minimum area, sufficient lighting, ascending rows of seats, dressing rooms, etc.). A desirable side effect of this building activity was that pupils often made up a considerable proportion of the audience. The idea of the hall construction chain, which attracted nationwide attention and was copied in Schleswig-Holstein, also had the advantage that similar conditions prevailed at the various locations and, for example, the stage design did not have to be adapted to the local conditions in each case.

Stromberg also had clear artistic ideas. He tried to minimize the number of guest performances by other theatres in Wilhelmshaven and thereby strengthen the ensemble spirit at the Landesbühne. His productions of classical plays (for example by Shakespeare, Schiller, Ibsen and Shaw) were in the tradition of Regietheater, adapted to the respective contemporary backgrounds with sometimes comprehensive strokes and were also noticed outside the state borders. Above all, however, Stromberg opened himself up to contemporary drama. The absurde Theater, which had been emerging since the mid-1950s, was represented at the Landesbühne by authors such as Eugène Ionesco (The Bald Singer; The Lesson; The Rhinoceroses) and Wolfgang Hildesheimer (The Delay)early on. In the course of the 1960s, the emphasis shifted in favor of deliberately socially critical literature. The anti-war play Mother Courage and Her Children by Bertolt Brecht, a series of bitter comedies by Friedrich Dürrenmatt, the cabaret-sketchy Nachrichten aus der Provinz by Jochen Ziem or Heinar Kipphardt's hotly debated period piece In der Sache J. Robert Oppenheimer. Stromberg also made his audience familiar with contemporary French theater; the repertoire included plays by Sartre, Camus, Giraudoux, Anouilh and Queneau. Stromberg rejected light, non-committal entertainment and defended his repertoire with a term derived from Sartre as "committed theater". We want, he wrote in a first summary after five years, that the events on stage ... call the visitor to reconsider old thoughts and convictions, admonish him to reflect on himself, to recognize and criticize his virtues and vices, challenge him to live with a clearer, better consciousness [sic] to give him courage to go his way more self-confidently, more individualistically, more courageously and more consistently.

This approach to the theater sometimes led to conflicts with the audience, which no longer attended the performances in such large numbers, especially in the smaller venues of the Landesbühne (for example in Varel and Jever). The theater responded with a series of "debate evenings", in which, in addition to the artistic director and directors, representatives of the adult education centers or municipal libraries also took part. In the spring of 1969 alone, representatives of the Landesbühne took part in no fewer than 21 discussion rounds throughout the entire theater area. However, the LBNN was not prepared to compromise on its repertoire policy. The directorate wanted to meet the need for a non-accusatory, non-oppressive theater, which the older generation, in particular, had asserted in the discussions, by staging Peter Handke's spoken play Publikumsbeschimpfung. However, the author forbade the theater, as well as other theaters at the time, to perform his play. Out of this necessity - and out of a certain amount of anger - the Landesbühne, under the aegis of actor and dramaturge Moritz Boerner, developed the production Die Publikumsbesänftigung, which, satirically broken, entered into a dialog with Handke's text and also confronted the audience with its demands.

The production Victor or the Children in Power (based on the drama of the same name by Roger Vitrac) was invited to the 2nd Norddeutsches Theatertreffen in Hamburg in 1972 and won a prize, which consisted of the production being broadcast on the Third Television Program of NDR, Radio Bremen and Sender Freies Berlin. In the fall of the same year, the Landesbühne celebrated its 20th anniversary. On the long journeys to the various venues, from which the actors and technicians often did not return until well after midnight, 724,822 kilometers had been covered by this time. Rudolf Stromberg, who had made a significant contribution to permanently establishing the Landesbühne as a cultural institution, was awarded the Niedersächsischer Verdienstorden in December 1973. By this time, he had already left Wilhelmshaven after 15 years as director and taken over the Städtische Bühnen Augsburg.

=== 1973 to 1979: Mario Krüger ===
Stromberg's successor was the former chief dramaturge in Kiel, Mario Krüger. During his six-year directorship, a long-planned project was realized. In 1976, new premises for workshops were opened in a side wing of the Wilhelmshaven municipal theater, so that the painters' hall, assembly hall, joinery, furniture warehouse, decoration hall, props rooms and an electrical warehouse for spotlights were now all under one roof. Previously, the stage sets had to be made in a barracks building in Schellingstraße, several kilometers away from the theater. As the rooms there were only three meters high, brochures and other large surfaces could only be produced or processed with the help of a complicated folding technique. For the technical staff of the Landesbühne, the new workshops, which were built for the relatively small sum of one million marks, made their work considerably easier.

The technicians at the Landesbühne also benefited from another of Krüger's measures. In addition to the BfA pension, a second pension, and thus greater social security was agreed for this group of employees. In this respect, the technical staff were put on an equal footing with the actors.

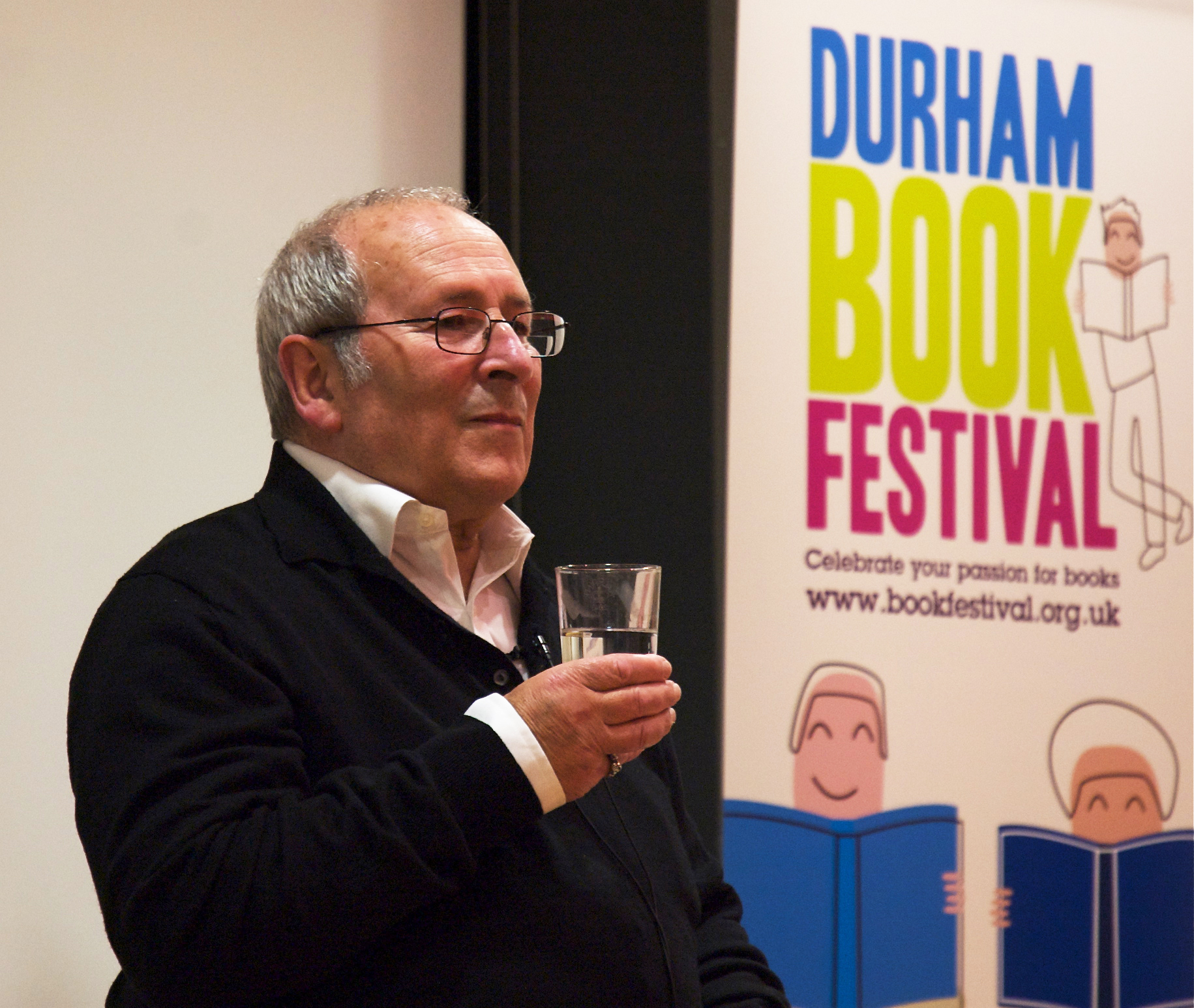
Arnold Wesker

In his repertoire policy, Mario Krüger deliberately set a different tone to the enlightened, socially critical theater of his predecessor. In the advertising booklet for the 1977/78 season, for example, he announced a newly understood popular theater, which he defined as a "theater for majorities". He described the "general comprehensibility of the subject matter" as an essential aspect of this. In a retrospective article 25 years later, on the occasion of a book publication about the Landesbühne, he saw the theater as an institution that had less to provoke or disturb than to "ensure the cohesion of society, to stabilize society". The result of these views was a theater that, according to the theater scholar Karl Veit Riedel, produced fewer experiments or even "depressive" works and instead "granted more space to the cheerful genre". Serious dramas, for example Death of a Salesman by Arthur Miller, were thematically emphasized boulevardesque productions such as Der Trauschein by Ephraim Kishon - and the contrast was heightened by the fact that the same actors, Barbara Dembeck and Klaus Hofer, played the central roles of the married couple in both productions. The summer season on Norderney, which traditionally marks the beginning of the Landesbühne's season, was once again dominated by lighter drama and crime plays.

Nevertheless, Mario Krüger and his artistic collaborators also occasionally took up contemporary themes. With the setting of Georg Kaiser's expressionist play Gas from 1918, the stage reacted to a series of major industrial settlements and bridge constructions in Wilhelmshaven that destroyed coastal landscapes in the 1970s, such as parts of the Geniusstrand in the Voslapp district. The lack of sensitivity in dealing with nature, which prompted young people in particular to protest, finds a counterpart in Kaiser's play in the ruthless exploitation of energy resources. Arnold Wesker's contemporary play Golden Cities, which deals with the failure of social utopias, was also particularly popular with young people. While Wesker's drama criticized the sober pragmatism of the Labour Party, Rolf Hochhuth's political comedy Die Hebamme, which the author himself staged in Wilhelmshaven in 1978, mocked it, among other things, the corruption of a senior city director of the SPD. Theatergoers in northwest Germany may have understood these attacks on the Social Democrats as an indirect confrontation with municipal decision-makers who had come under criticism in connection with the construction of a PVC plant of Imperial Chemical Industries on the Innenjade.

=== 1979 to 1994: Georg Immelmann ===
The Landesbühne Niedersachsen Nord experienced a new heyday from 1979, when Georg Immelmann, the former chief dramaturge of the Theater Aachen, took over the directorship in Wilhelmshaven. He engaged Johannes Kaetzler, who had previously worked as an assistant to Ingmar Bergman at the Residenztheater in Munich, as head dramaturge until 1984. Together with the dramaturge Kurt Kreiler, a theater program was developed that self-confidently called for the refusal of provincial thinking became the focus of attention. As part of this program, however, there was also a "commitment to the province". In the 1986/87 season, Georg Immelmann staged the only play in world literature set in Wilhelmshaven, namely Ernst Toller's historical play Fire from the Boilers (1930), in which the author reconstructs the Kiel mutiny of fall 1918. The production was staged during the Filbinger affair and the heated discussions surrounding the death sentences of the former naval judge. The LBNN worked on the topic of naval jurisdiction, especially during the First World War, in cooperation with various departments of the German Navy; at the same time, an exhibition was set up in the foyer of the Stadttheater, the former naval directorate. The performances and accompanying events were well received by the public.

While artistic director Stromberg had still shown a preference for French drama, Scandinavian classics were now conspicuously frequent in the repertoire. Johannes Kaetzler staged the comparatively rarely performed Ibsen drama The Lady of the Sea, which was followed by Gespenster, An Enemy of the People and Nora or a Doll's Home. As early as 1981/82, the Landesbühne presented August Strindberg's relationship play Fräulein Julie; four years later, it ventured into the very short, dramatically concentrated monodrama Die Stärkere by the same author. In the area of Kinder- und Jugendtheater, the LBNN also relied on Scandinavian literature with Selma Lagerlöf and the Swedish playwrights Barbro Lindgren and Ninne Olsson, who had hardly been introduced in Germany at the time.

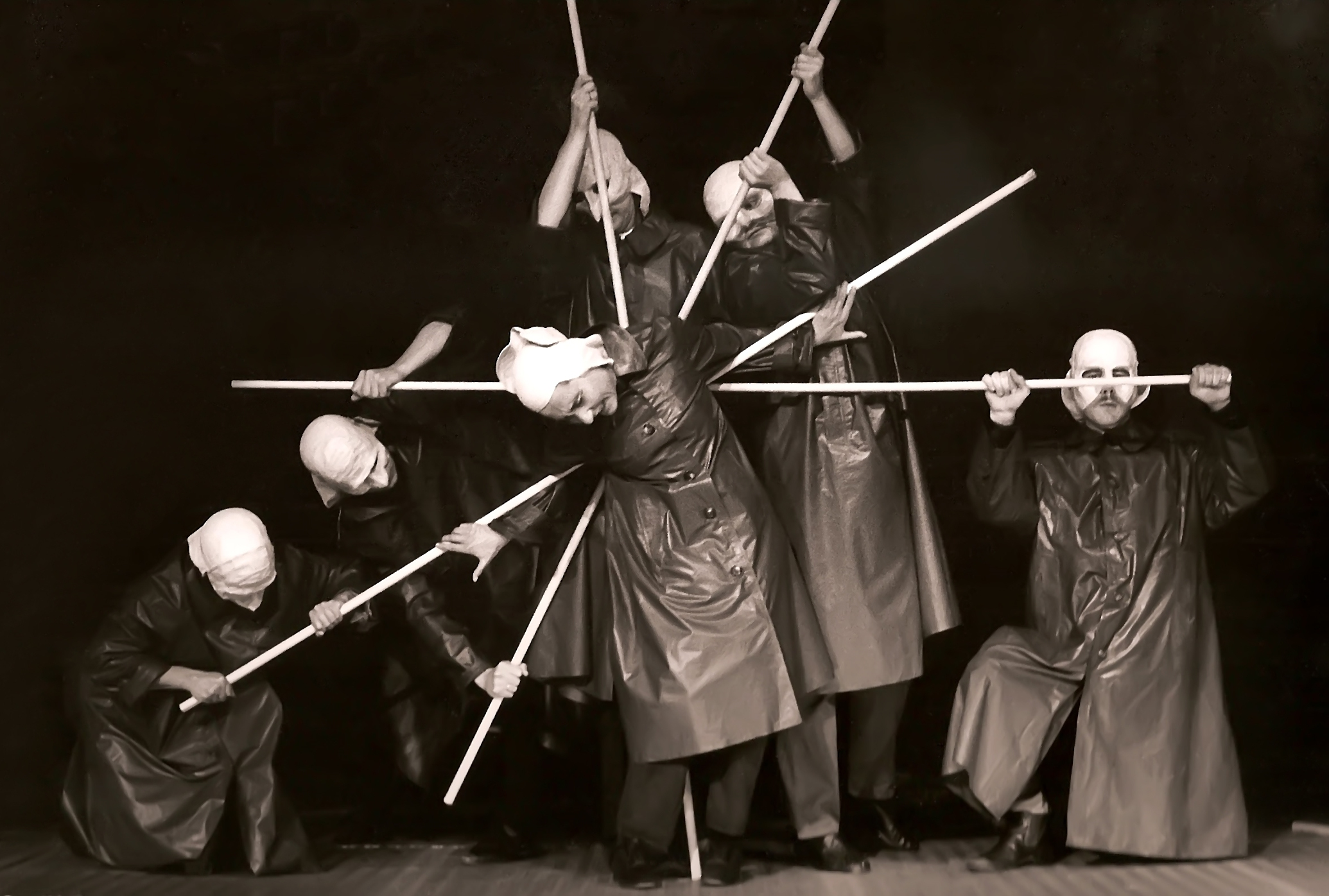
Knut Weber und Ensemble: PEST (AIDS-Projekt), Saison 1988/89

The constant search for the undiscovered gradually led to a veritable "trend towards forgotten classics" during Immelmann's directorship. The play Goethes Jahrmarktsfest zu Plundersweilern in the adaptation by Peter Hacks, Friedrich Hebbel's bourgeois tragedy Maria Magdalena, which is generally considered outdated, and even his extensive tragedy Die Nibelungen, which was spread over two evenings under the impression of reunification (1989/90 season). One of the first plays Immelmann presented to North German audiences was Lessing's rarely performed youth play The Jews, which deals with religious tolerance. As he was in doubt as to whether the comedy could still be performed without changes 250 years after the author's birth in 1979, he commissioned the playwright Erwin Sylvanus to adapt the text in order to establish a connection to the present day. Sylvanus decided to take the typical nature of the one-act play, which had been created under the influence of the commedia dell'arte, as the starting point for a free continuation. In particular, he focused his attention on opening up the characters, confronting the characters with what they believe they are, letting them feel and experience the consequences of this. From the Lessing production, the arc spanned to the targeted "confrontation with the foreign", which was an explicit focus of Immelmann's last season, 1993/94. With accents of this kind, the artistic direction of the LBNN reacted directly to social developments. In an announcement, it said: "Perhaps the biggest problem in reunified Germany and in a not yet unified Europe is the fear of the foreigner, a fear that breeds aggression and turns into hatred, which causes violence. We believe that theater today must face up to this problem. We know that it cannot offer solutions. But it can show examples from the past, describe models of the present and develop utopias for the future." In this context, Brecht's Refugee Talks, Shakespeare's classic Othello, Witold Gombrowicz' comedy Yvonne, the Burgundian Princess and Marivaux's early Enlightenment Dispute. The German premiere of George Tabori's émigré drama Requiem for a Spy also fell within the context of the preoccupation with xenophobia.

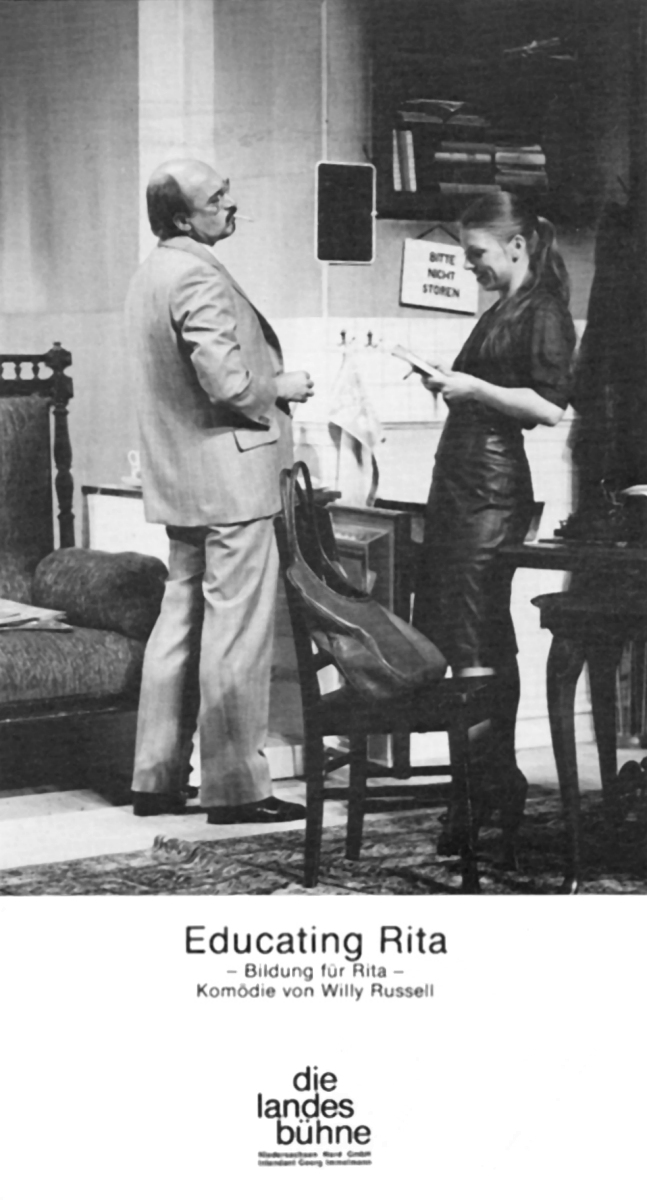
Program booklet for Willy Russell, Educating Rita, 1981/82 season, directed by Peter Lüdi

The programmatic rejection of provincial thinking implied that the expectations of theatergoers were in part consciously countered. When the AIDS shock triggered several waves of tabooing in the course of the 1980s, the then head dramaturge of the Landesbühne, Knut Weber, and the ensemble dealt with the current topic in the form of a choreographically accentuated reappraisal. Other repertoire decisions led to direct disagreements with the audience in various places. Georg Immelmann opened his second season (1980/81) on Norderney with the subversive Farce Bezahlt wird nicht! by the later Nobel Prize winner Dario Fo. As the venue, the venerable Kurtheater, was expected to be a harmless entertainment, the first audience members left the auditorium after just twenty minutes, heckling and protesting. Other controversial plays such as Peter Turrini's Minderleister followed. Klaus Pohl (playwright) Klaus Pohls Drama Das alte Land, which was set immediately after the end of the war in the area around Stade (one of the theater's detour locations at the time), could not be performed in some places because the local organizers rigorously rejected it after the television broadcast of a Cologne production. In contrast, the Landesbühne was the first German theater to show the play Untertier by Thomas Strittmatter in the 1991/92 season by subscription. The play illustrates how brutal everyday professional life rubs off on private, interpersonal relationships; the production began with a scene in which police officers stand naked in the shower and talk about their problems. The performances were fiercely rejected by parts of the audience and the press ("agonizingly boring and unintentionally comical production"). There was also criticism in some of the smaller venues of the Landesbühne, such as Papenburg, where the play was quickly replaced by another production. A citizens' initiative was then founded in Leer, which demanded that the play not be canceled; the performance was a success there.

The Landesbühne also received approval for a number of other productions. The play The Journalists by the British playwright Arnold Wesker, who had already been introduced to the theater, had its German premiere in Wilhelmshaven in September 1981. The author was present at the rehearsals and arranged for Christopher Hewitt, whose Simultaneous Stage impressed as a guest from London. Another British play, the comedy Educating Rita, was also staged in German translation for the first time at a state theater venue (Norderney) and subsequently performed nationwide. The theater was also the fourth European theater ever to take on the intellectually challenging play The New Trial by Peter Weiss. The trade journal Theater heute praised Johannes Kaetzler's production, which was characterized by "urgency and distance" in equal measure, and attested that the actors, including the over 80-year-old Irmgard Solm, were more than up to the task. In 1985, the same magazine described the Landesbühne as the rising star of the season; in the annual ranking of the best German-language theaters, it took fourth place behind the Münchner Kammerspiele, the Stadttheater Freiburg and the Munich Residenztheater.

During Georg Immelmann's directorship, the Wilhelmshaven Municipal Theatre underwent a long-planned renovation in 1983. A comprehensive modernization meant that the tiers in the auditorium were removed, reducing the ticket quota to 600 seats, which were now located exclusively in the stalls. At the same time, the foyer areas of the theater were expanded. Of even greater significance was the inauguration of a second venue for the Landesbühne in Wilhelmshaven. In September 1989, the company moved into the premises of a former vocational school in Rheinstraße 91, which houses both the Junges Theater with its own staff and the Studio for more intimate performances. The Junges Theater, which celebrated its 20th anniversary in 2009, now describes itself as the oldest and largest children's and youth theater in Lower Saxony.

=== 1994 to 1998: Troubled years ===
After Georg Immelmann left Wilhelmshaven in 1994 after fifteen years of service, the institutional separation between the Landesbühne Niedersachsen Nord and the Stadttheater Wilhelmshaven, which had existed since 1952, was abolished. The management of both institutions was now contractually in one hand. However, the resulting synergy effects initially failed to materialize, which was also due to the fact that the new artistic director Thomas Bockelmann, who had moved to the coast as director of the Zimmertheater Tübingen, left the Landesbühne after just two years and took over the Städtische Bühnen in Münster. In the short time he worked in Lower Saxony, he was unable to give the theater its own profile. However, it was Bockelmann who introduced the summer theater in Wilhelmshaven's Stadtpark, for which an adaptation of Goethe's Urfaust was created as an open-air event.

After Bockelmann's surprising departure, the administrative director Arnold Preuß, who had also been head of the Niederdeutsche Bühne since the mid-1980s, acted as "interim artistic director" of the Landesbühne from 1996. He tried to build on the work of his predecessors and the recipes for success of the past. Among other things, he took up the idea of the open-air play and selected Theodor Storm's novella Der Schimmelreiter - with reference to the landscape - which was premiered in Wilhelmshaven in 1997 in a commissioned version by the Argentinean Norberto Presta. Georg Immelmann, whose Bekenntnis zur Provinz (Confession to the Province) had established the reworking of material from the region, returned to the Landesbühne as director. The Schimmelreiter performances were well received by the audience, and the press also found that the play was not staged for the Gartenlaube.

=== 1998 to 2013: Gerhard Hess ===
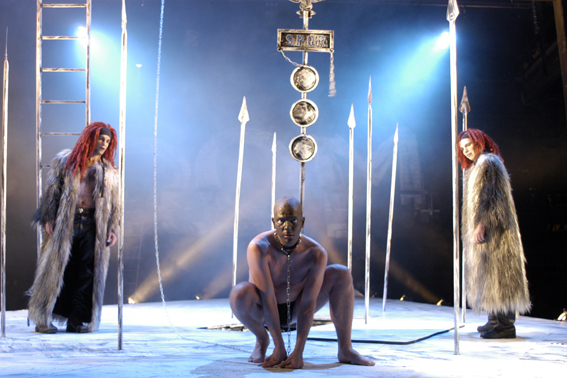
William Shakespeare: Titus Andronicus, Saison 2004/05, Regie: Reinhardt Friese

In May 1998, the supervisory board of the special-purpose association Gerhard Hess was elected as the new director of the Landesbühne. Born in Switzerland, he had worked as a freelance director in Mannheim, Wiesbaden and Dortmund, among other places. Hess came to Wilhelmshaven with the ambition to "create a theater that not only provides a basic service, but [a] theater that does not exclude itself from the content-related and aesthetic discussion of the German theater scene". In an age of digital information technology and the rapid accessibility of leading metropolitan theaters, the contrast between metropolis and province had also become obsolete for Hess. From his first season onwards, his aim was to "use the resources of the Landesbühne to create a theater of supra-regional significance".

In order to fulfill these ambitions, he sometimes took unusual paths. "Thematically explosive" Plays were to be a focal point of the theater, and to this end it entered into long-term collaborations with young authors - atypical for a regional theater. The playwright Katharina Gericke wrote six plays on behalf of the Landesbühne between 2000 and 2009, all of which were premiered in Wilhelmshaven. The aesthetics and themes of the works were quite heterogeneous. Gericke's play Geister Bahn, which premiered in November 2000 in the Studio, tells the story of the rise and fall of a boy group from the East and, according to critics, contrasted the shallow chill-out cosmos of the pop generation with a theatrical language reminiscent of Heiner Müller, among other things, in a not very successful way. In Che or The Star of Boina, the author explored the myth of Che Guevara, who fails as an idealist in the Bolivian jungle; the production was praised for its atmospheric density. The last two commissioned works for the Landesbühne showed Gericke's broad spectrum particularly clearly: while Buckliges Mädchen was again set in the disintegrating GDR and this time revolved around 9 November 1989, in the fall of 2009 she adapted the Nibelungen story, which director Olaf Strieb turned into a garish comic strip.

The Landesbühne also secured the first performance rights for Dominik Finkelde's dark dystopia Berlin Underground, which deals with the break-up of the two-class society in the near future as well as the lies of the media that hypocritically accompany this process (1999/2000 season). The author's next play to be seen in northwest Germany, Porzellanschiff, took up almost the entire ensemble of the Landesbühne. An assembly of aristocrats, parvenus and amateur poets, including Charlemagne and Joan of Arc, celebrated their own decline on a luxury steamer suspended in time and space, revealing the economic, moral and emotional lack of freedom of a closed society (2002/2003 season). The collaboration with another young playwright, Tine Rahel Völcker, resulted among other things in the premiere of her work Albertz about the Protestant pastor and governing mayor of Berlin. As has been the case several times in the past, this was a Landesbühne production about the relationship between power and morality using the example of an SPD politician.

Even if the critics rarely considered these productions to be successful down to the last detail, the continuous dialog with younger authors, the supply of contemporary drama to smaller venues and the general willingness of the Landesbühne to take risks were praised – "für einen Spielplan, neben dem manch besser dotiertes Theater schüchtern wirkt". The sometimes spectacular premieres in the area of musical theater can also be seen as an example of this courage. In February 2003, the Landesbühne staged a production accompanied by great media interest, The biography of the actress and singer Hildegard Knef was brought to the stage in the form of a musical. Knef herself had already conceived a stage work for Broadway in 1979 based on her worldwide success Der geschenkte Gaul together with the composer Harold Faltermeyer, but it was never realized. Instead of New York, the Knef chansons could now be heard in Wilhelmshaven. The libretto had been developed by the director and then head stage manager Reinhardt Friese in close cooperation with Knef's husband Paul von Schell - and with the starting point in the 1979 manuscript. The performances attracted almost 10,000 spectators. This success was surpassed in early 2010 by the rock musical Meta, Norddeich, a tribute to the unconventional Norder Meta Rogall, who in the 1960s and '70s hired international bands for her music club Haus Waterkant, which was famous throughout East Frisia. Within a short time, all 30 performances with guest Angelika Bartsch in the lead role were sold out. Almost 3,000 spectators saw the musical in Norden alone.

The LBNN has also produced a number of first or world premieres of foreign drama, such as David Hare's Skylight (2000/2001 season) or David Lescot's works Pleite - Anfang und Ende (Un homme en faillite); 2006/2007 season and Es lebe Europa! (2007/2008 season). In addition, artistic director Hess surprised the audience by staging some difficult classics such as Shakespeare's Titus Andronicus (2004/05 season). In his endeavor to "also preserve and maintain the unknown, the already lost". Hess has made some interesting excavations and rediscoveries. He made his debut as a director in the fall of 1998 with Christian Dietrich Grabbe's unwieldy comedy Scherz, Satire, Ironie und tiefere Bedeutung, which also offered the opportunity to bring together almost all of the theater's actors in one production and introduce them to the audience. This was followed by productions of plays that were sometimes only known to literary historians, for example Die Freier by Joseph von Eichendorff (2001/2002 season) or Sturm und Drang by Friedrich Maximilian Klinger (2004/2005 season). The baroque drama Ermordete Majestät (Carolus Stuardus) by Andreas Gryphius had not even been performed by a German theater for over 200 years before its Wilhelmshaven premiere in March 2006; the theme of the religious legitimization of power and the resistance to it emphasized by the production nevertheless appeared to the critics to be "red-hot".

Another reinterpretation of a classic at the Landesbühne generated a great response at the beginning of 2004, although - or precisely because - the performance concept had been stopped by legal action. The young director Philipp Kochheim wanted to cast Samuel Beckett's play Waiting for Godot partly with women (roles of Estragon and Lucky), contrary to the author's instructions, and to stage the dialog as a couple's dialog. However, the S. Fischer Verlag had the performances banned on behalf of the Beckett heirs, so that the Landesbühne could only present the play as a reading. Newspapers even in India reported on the legal disputes and Indonesien.

At the beginning of April 2012, Hess announced that he would be terminating his contract, which runs until 2016, early at the end of the 2012/2013 season "at his own request". Just a few days after Hess' announcement, the special-purpose association of the Landesbühne elected a successor in the person of Olaf Strieb, the current head of the theater. The election was unanimous and unopposed. In June 2013, Hess retired as director of the Landesbühne Niedersachsen Nord. The mayor of Wilhelmshaven Andreas Wagner awarded Hess the City Medal on this occasion.

=== Since 2013: Olaf Strieb ===
The new artistic director Olaf Strieb opened his first season (2013/2014) with the production Buddenbrooks, a theatrical adaptation of the well-known novel by Thomas Mann. Olaf Strieb is committed to offering pleasing theater. This only led to a further increase in attendance in the low single-digit percentage range, but also meant that the Landesbühne hardly attracted any national attention. Audience figures then plummeted from 2017 onwards. The COVID-19 pandemic then exacerbated the negative trend from 2020. Since October 2013, the Landesbühne has been supported by a sponsoring association. In February 2016, the Theater im Oceanis (TheoS am Bontekai) opened with the musical Die Fantasticks in place of the dilapidated youth theater and studio in Rheinstraße.

As the Stadttheater Wilhelmshaven could not be used at the start of the 2022/2023 season due to extensive renovation work, the Landesbühne moved to an alternative venue in a former DIY store. The hall, known as "Provisorium 29", has 402 seats.

== Profile ==
=== Division ===
==== Focus on spoken theater ====
Shortly after the founding of the Ostfriesische Landesbühne in Leer, a trend towards spoken theater became apparent. Although there was a strong demand for light-hearted music and operettas in the first years after the war, the first directors of the Landesbühne, Wilhelm Grothe and Herbert Paris, decided to put on only a few such performances, as they felt that the small ensemble was unable to cope with this task. In the beginning, guest singers were occasionally engaged, but due to scheduling difficulties, this practice did not prove successful. Hermann Ludwig also had no sympathy for the musical comedy - due to his demand for quality; during his directorship, only Karl Farkas' and Robert Katscher's By Candlelight reached the stage (1956/57 season).

While his predecessors tended to explain their choice of repertoire with practical constraints and the personnel situation, Rudolf Stromberg justified his skepticism towards music theater with artistic reservations. This even led to an open conflict with the city of Wilhelmshaven, which did not share Stromberg's concept of a pure theater operation. Not least for this reason, there was a dual personnel solution between 1958 and 1964 with Rudolf Stromberg (director of the Landesbühne) and Rudolf Sang (artistic director of the Stadttheater Wilhelmshaven). Mario Krüger, who was generally more open-minded towards entertainment theater, only occasionally integrated musical pieces into his repertoire, such as the musicals Kiss me Kate (1974/75 season) or Irma la Douce (1976/77 season).

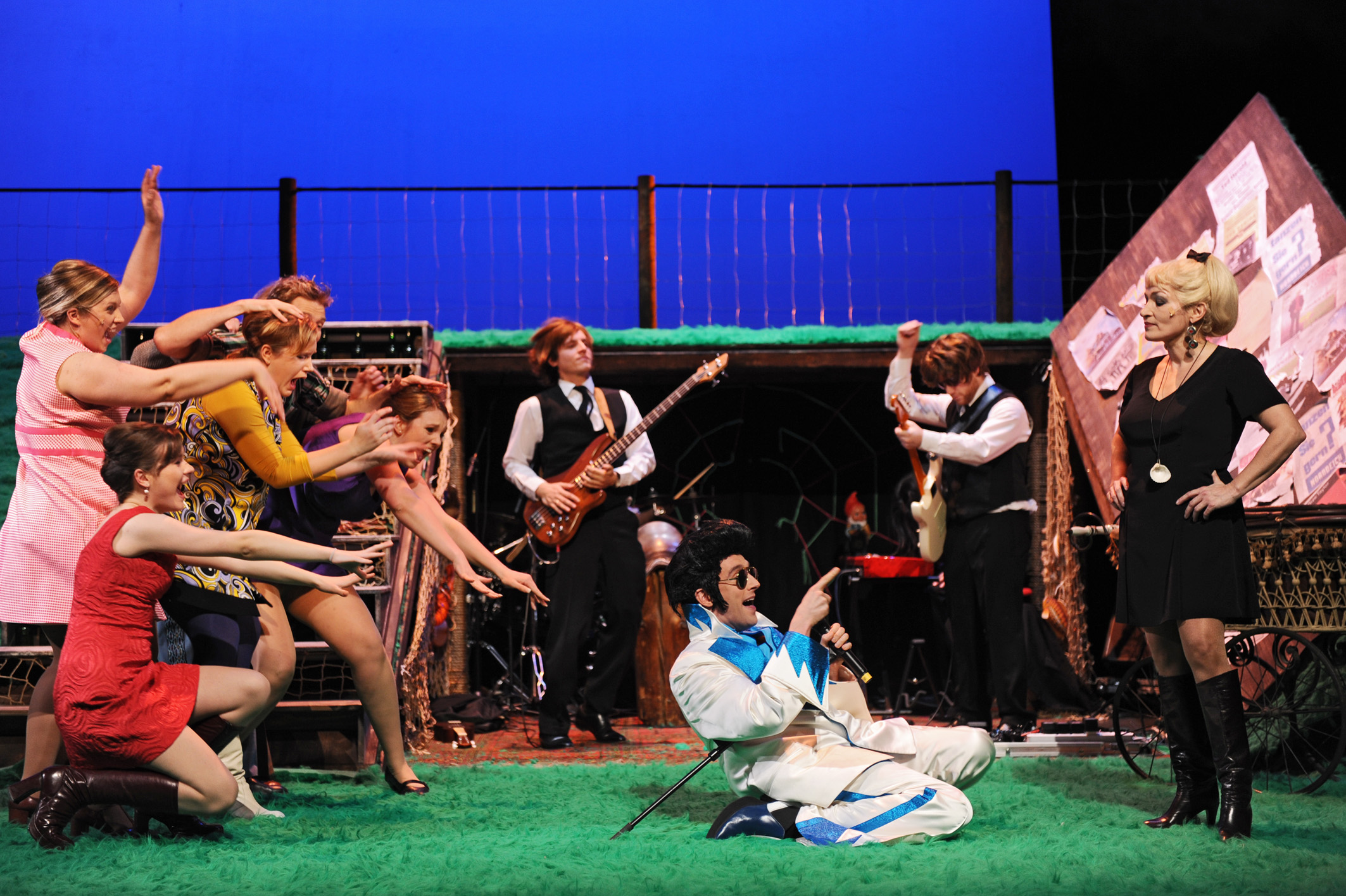
Peter Schanz: Meta, Norddeich (rock musical), 2009/10 season, directed by Ingo Putz

Georg Immelmann and his artistic collaborators cultivated a special form of musical theater: they developed - as world premieres - revues critical of certain periods of German history, such as the Biedermeier Revue (1979/80 season) or the Gründerzeit Revue (1980/81 season). When musicals appeared in the repertoire on rare occasions, this was to support dramaturgical focal points such as the confrontation with xenophobia. For the classic West Side Story (1993/94 season), for example, some of the most important roles were played by Greek, Turkish and Yugoslavian young people. Musical theater productions have only taken on a somewhat broader scope since 1998, when Gerhard Hess took over the Landesbühne. In addition to the successes Der geschenkte Gaul and Meta, Norddeich, Singspiels such as Ralph Benatzky's Im weißen Rößl or musicals such as Kiss me, Kate, Ein Käfig voller Narren or Anatevka were produced.

In addition to spoken theater and, to a lesser extent, musical theater, performances for children and schoolchildren form a third pillar of the LBNN. Other forms of theater - such as ballet or figure theater - can be seen at the Landesbühne only very rarely and exclusively in the form of guest performances.

==== Children's and youth theater ====
The Kinder- und Jugendtheater played an important role early on. Even in the first few seasons, fairy tales such as Cinderella, Rumpelstiltskin and Peter's Ride on the Moon fairy tales in the repertoire of the Landesbühne, which quickly established themselves as a permanent institution. A first premiere in the area of children's theater took place at the beginning of the Stromberg era, when Wolf Dieter Pahlke's fairy tale musical Circus Children took to the stage (1959/60 season). While the theater offerings for young audiences in the first twenty years after the founding of the LBNN were largely limited to the Christmas season, these activities intensified in the 1970s. A children's and youth theater group was formed within the ensemble, which developed an open form of play involving the audience. The performances were designed for smaller spaces so that they could also be shown in rural communities away from the actual venues.

After Georg Immelmann became artistic director, the Landesbühne made a special effort to attract young audiences. It was the only theater in the Federal Republic to show Leonie Ossowski's play Voll auf der Rolle, which had premiered at the Grips-Theater in Berlin, in the evening program - also to stimulate dialogue between the generations. The production Columbus discovers America (based on the drama of the same name by Karl Wesseler) was awarded a prize at the 10th North German Theatertreffen in Lübeck in 1981. The jury highlighted the so-called "integrated model" of the LBNN, which provides for the actors to perform both in the evening (mostly in plays for an adult audience) and in the afternoon (in children's theater). More than half of the total of 162,000 spectators who attended the performances of the Landesbühne in this season, 1980/1981, were children and schoolchildren thanks to fairy-tale plays performed at the same time; the number represented an attendance record that has not been equaled since. The LBNN received an important impulse for its further work in the field of children's and youth theater from the opening of the Junges Theater in Wilhelmshaven's Rheinstraße (1989). In order to further develop the gradually rich tradition at the Landesbühne, Gerhard Hess founded the German-Dutch youth theater festival Vis á vis in 1999, based in Emden, which seeks to unite the best of the German and Dutch youth theater scene every two years. Every year, a Christmas tale is on the program for children.

=== Theater pedagogy ===
Parallel to the expansion of children's and youth theater, the Landesbühne hired a theater pedagogue for the first time in 1976, who developed his own plays with young people. In close cooperation with the schools in the play area, the main aim was to promote initiative. This resulted in the play Parka, Jeans and 16 Years, which was performed at the Wilhelmshaven Communication center Pumpwerk and won a special prize at the 7th North German Theatertreffen in Hamburg. The Landesbühne also tried to involve senior citizens in the theater. In Emden, women aged between 65 and 90, some of whom were in wheelchairs, came together to form the group "Die Wagemutigen" (The Daring Ones) and performed scenes from their everyday lives. Another theatre group for the elderly, "Die Wellenbrecher", was formed in Wilhelmshaven, where the "Junges Theater" was available as a rehearsal and performance venue from 1989. Low German play groups and folk dance circles were also included in the theater pedagogical model.

The Lower Saxony Foundation supported the LBNN's "Children's and Senior Citizens' Theater" project for three years from the beginning of the 1989/90 season with DM 600,000 each; the special-purpose association and the state of Lower Saxony had previously agreed to provide follow-up funding for the project, which continues to this day. There are currently two "children's clubs" (for children aged 8 and over & for children aged 12 and over) at the Wilhelmshaven headquarters, and a "youth club" (for young people aged 15 and over), which has developed a joint scene collage with the South African youth theater group Victory Sonqoba Theatre Company (spring 2009), and the senior citizens' group "Die Silbermöwen".

=== Artistic direction and ensemble ===
The Landesbühne Niedersachsen Nord has repeatedly been recognized as a "youthful company" a reference not only to the relatively short history of the institution, but also to the young age of many of its employees. As a rule, the directors of the Landesbühne take on their first directorship in Wilhelmshaven after a long period as freelance directors or chief dramaturges. Rudolf Stromberg was 32 years old when he took over, Mario Krüger 38, Gerhard Hess hardly any older. Senior stage managers also often move to the north at a young age; Johannes Kaetzler, for example, came to Lower Saxony from Munich at the age of 27. Despite their often limited experience, artistic directors, directors and dramaturges are responsible for important artistic areas at the Landesbühne.

The same applies to the actors. Since the first seasons, the ensemble has always been very young; it is not unusual for the actors to have their first permanent engagement at the Landesbühne Niedersachsen Nord. Although they have just graduated from drama school, they often play leading roles (such as Hamlet, Käthchen or Nora) straight away. For this privilege, they have to make the sacrifice of a low beginner's fee of just 1600 euros gross (as of 2009) and grueling bus rides to the sometimes distant venues to take on.

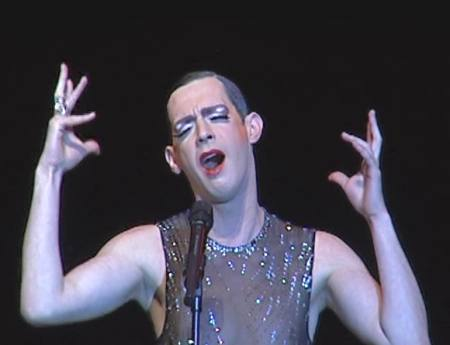
Tim Fischer

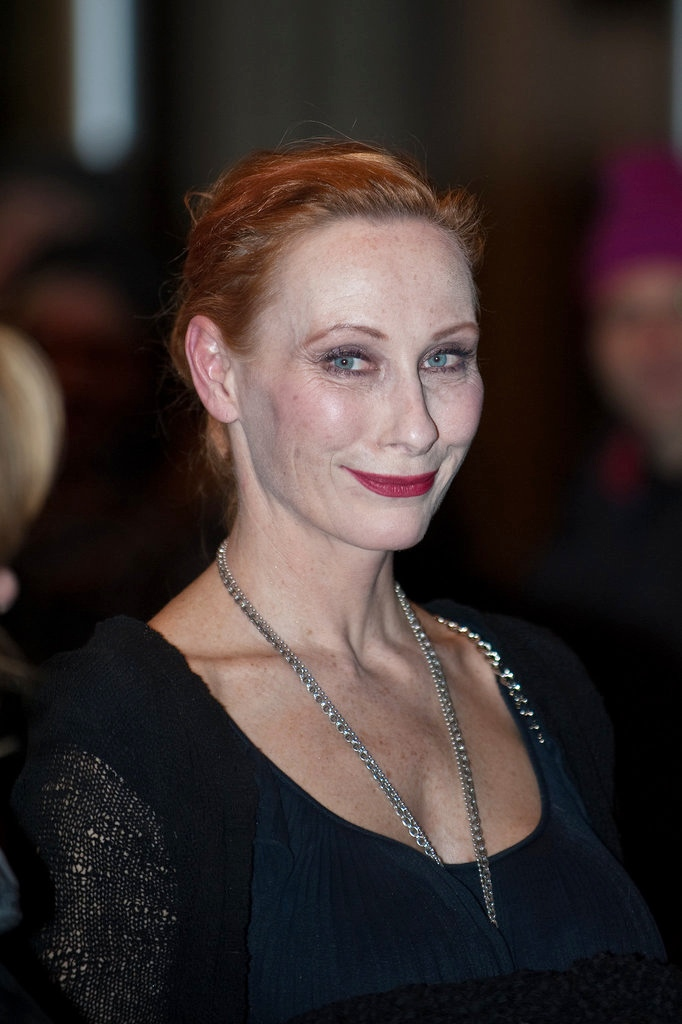
Andrea Sawatzki

The young age structure of its ensemble occasionally poses problems for the theater. Director Immelmann, for example, admitted that working with the young actors was "delightful", but at the same time conceded that the cooperation between the many young and the few older actors did not always work smoothly. In view of the young and overly homogeneous ensemble, directors also frequently encountered the difficulty of not being able to cast their productions appropriately. For this reason, the supervisory board of the special-purpose association repeatedly complained that the Landesbühne lacked "seasoned actors". Some performers use the "springboard function" of the theater, i.e. access to attractive roles in order to recommend themselves for other engagements. At various times, this resulted in directors of larger theaters regularly attending LBNN performances and poaching the best actors from the ensemble. For this reason, staff turnover was relatively high at times.

Well-known artists who have performed at the Landesbühne include the chanson singer Tim Fischer, who took on a role in Rainer Bielfeldt's musical Kennwort Einsames Herz at the beginning of his career in 1991, the actress Andrea Sawatzki, who also appeared in a number of drama and children's theater productions in the early 1990s, and the successful theater and television actor Siegfried W. Kernen, known from the German television crime series Schwarz-Rot-Gold, who took up his first permanent engagement at the LBNN in 1964. The musician Still Jürn, among other things part of the folk duo Jan & Jürn, was an actor in the LBNN ensemble, as was Thomas Pommer, who now works primarily as a television producer. The well-known painter Rainer Fetting completed a traineeship in stage design during Stromberg's directorship.

Although many members of the ensemble only stay at the Landesbühne for a few years, there are examples of actors who have been with the company for decades. On 2 September 1971, Elisabeth Thiel was awarded honorary membership for her 25 years of service to the stage; she had joined the Landesbühne when it was still based in Leer. Other actors who spent most of their careers at the LBNN were Irmgard Solm, Barbara Dembeck, Harry Burmeister, Oskar Matull and Johannes Simons.

The size of the ensemble has remained relatively constant in the almost 60-year history of the Landesbühne. At the beginning of the 1950s, the ensemble consisted of "mostly 9 women and 12 men", in the 1960s of 9 women and 15 men. In the 2009/2010 season, 8 female and 14 male actors were engaged at the Landesbühne, plus around 15 guests for individual productions. In addition to the head director, the theater employed three dramaturges (two for drama and one for children's and youth theater), but no permanent director. Some of the actors - in addition to the artistic director - were also entrusted with directing duties, otherwise the theater worked with freelance directors.

=== Principles of the game plan ===
After frequent changes in the early years, the area covered by the Landesbühne in northern Lower Saxony has not changed since the mid-1990s. Politically and sociologically, this landscape can be described as very heterogeneous. While the industrial cities of Emden and Wilhelmshaven as well as the districts of Aurich and Leer are considered social democratic strongholds, the rural areas around Papenburg and Vechta are Catholic and conservative. On the island of Norderney, both locals and pleasure-seeking spa guests find their way to the theater. The surprisingly different mentality of the audience, also the diverse cultural committees of the municipalities, have had an influence on the work of the respective artistic directors since the founding of the Landesbühne. Nevertheless, it was never the intention of a theater director to focus parts of the repertoire specifically on a particular location. Until the 1990s, the only exceptions were the "summer seasons" on Norderney, when the entire artistic staff of the Landesbühne stayed on the island for several weeks and offered its guests a colorful, varied program. Some directors appreciated being able to bring the ensemble together in one place so that the actors could get to know each other better. Overall, however, the disadvantages of this solution outweighed the advantages, so that Norderney now has the status of one of several permanent venues that is visited several times a season - with different productions.

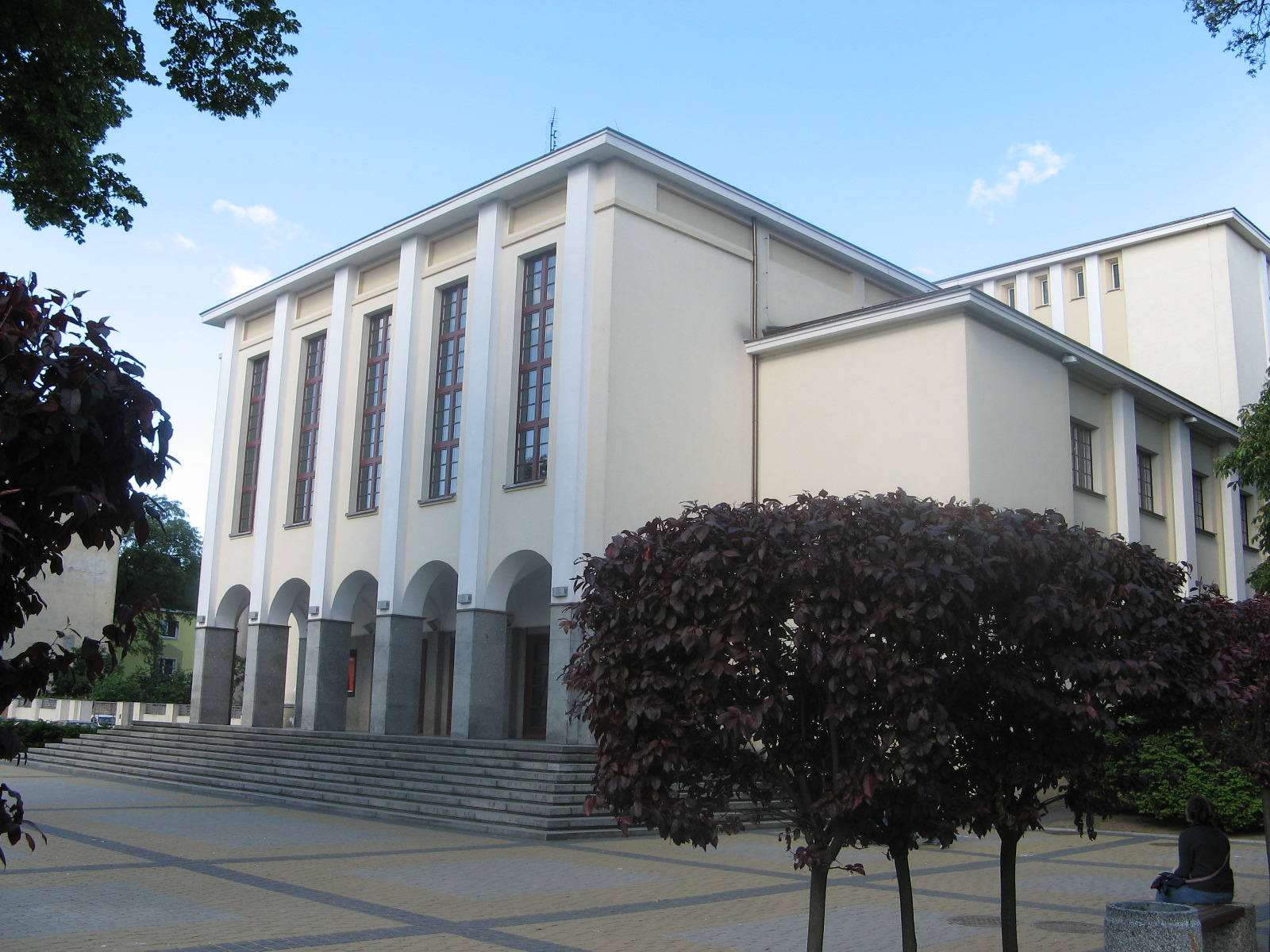
The Polski Theater in Bydgoszcz

Although the individual directors set different priorities, they largely followed the concept of a "mixed program", which rested on four pillars: the classics, contemporary theater, entertainment and children's and youth theater. This broad program was intended to appeal to as large an audience as possible and generate the necessary income. The mix could vary greatly depending on the times and the artistic temperament of the theater director. While in the years after the war, the focus was on the educational mission of the theater and a correspondingly high number of school classics were staged, Rudolf Stromberg made it his task to "promote the work of contemporary authors" so that in the 1967/68 season, for example, seven topical plays were on the program. Stromberg's successor Krüger opened up more to entertainment theater and, in addition to comedies such as Ein Glas Wasser or Charley's Aunt, brought a dramatization of Herman Wouk's novel Die Caine war ihr Schicksal to the stage, for example. With Georg Immelmann - with an otherwise balanced repertoire - the exemplary reappraisal of regional history began, which continued after his departure. Gerhard Hess and his colleagues again specifically promoted young playwrights and, following the success of Meta, Norddeich, launched the Schlicksoldaten project funded by the Kulturstiftung des Bundes in spring 2010, which dealt artistically with the navy as the nucleus of the city of Wilhelmshaven - with the participation of soldiers, civilian employees and their family members.

Another constant within the "mixed repertoire" since the first seasons of the LBNN has been a strong interest in German and Eastern European history, including the themes of flight and expulsion. The dramas by Honold and Oelschlegel performed in the 1950s, which dealt with the war and post-war years, already pointed in this direction. Under Rudolf Stromberg, the play Silvester 1944 by the Czech playwright Vlastimil Šubrt was premiered, which deals with a murder case in Prague in the last winter of the war and shows how Czechs and Germans, even years after the crime, accuse each other of the crime on the basis of prejudice (1965/66 season). Later, also during Mario Krüger's directorship, some of Václav Havel's, Pavel Kohout's and Sławomir Mrożek's short dramas were on the program. Several texts by Katharina Gericke shed light on the last days of the GDR, while the performance Sonnenfinsternis, based on the novel by Arthur Koestler, recalled the practices of the Stalinist secret police. Stalinist secret police (2000/2001 season). The aim of a multi-year collaboration with the Teatr Polski in Bydgoszcz was to jointly examine the Bydgoszcz Bloody Sunday from a German and Polish perspective. The background to the collaboration included the fact that large parts of the German minority living in Bydgoszcz settled in Wilhelmshaven shortly after the end of the war. The premiere of the play "Bromberg/ Bydgoszcz" (authors: Katharina Gericke / Artur Palyga, director: Grażyna Kania) took place in Poland in October 2012.

== Present ==
=== Venues ===
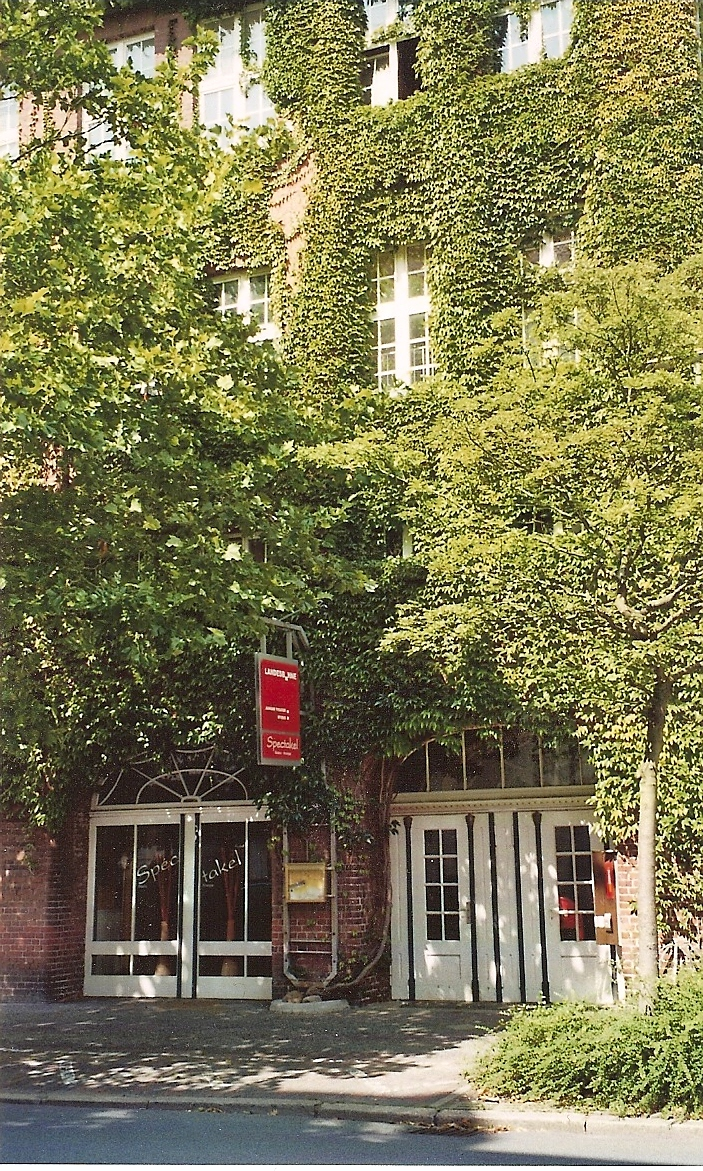
The former Young Theater or Studio in Wilhelmshaven

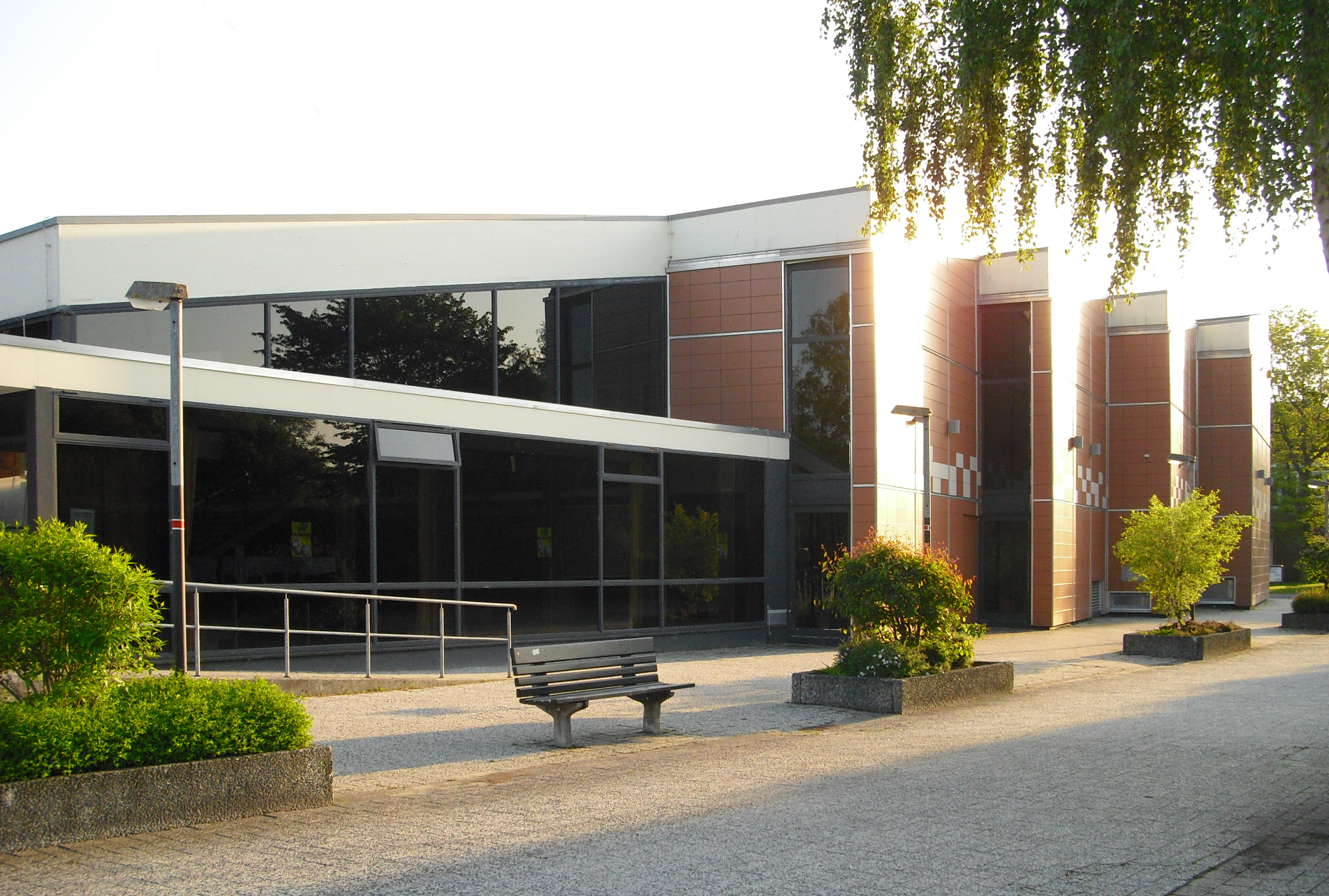
Theater am Dannhalm in Jever

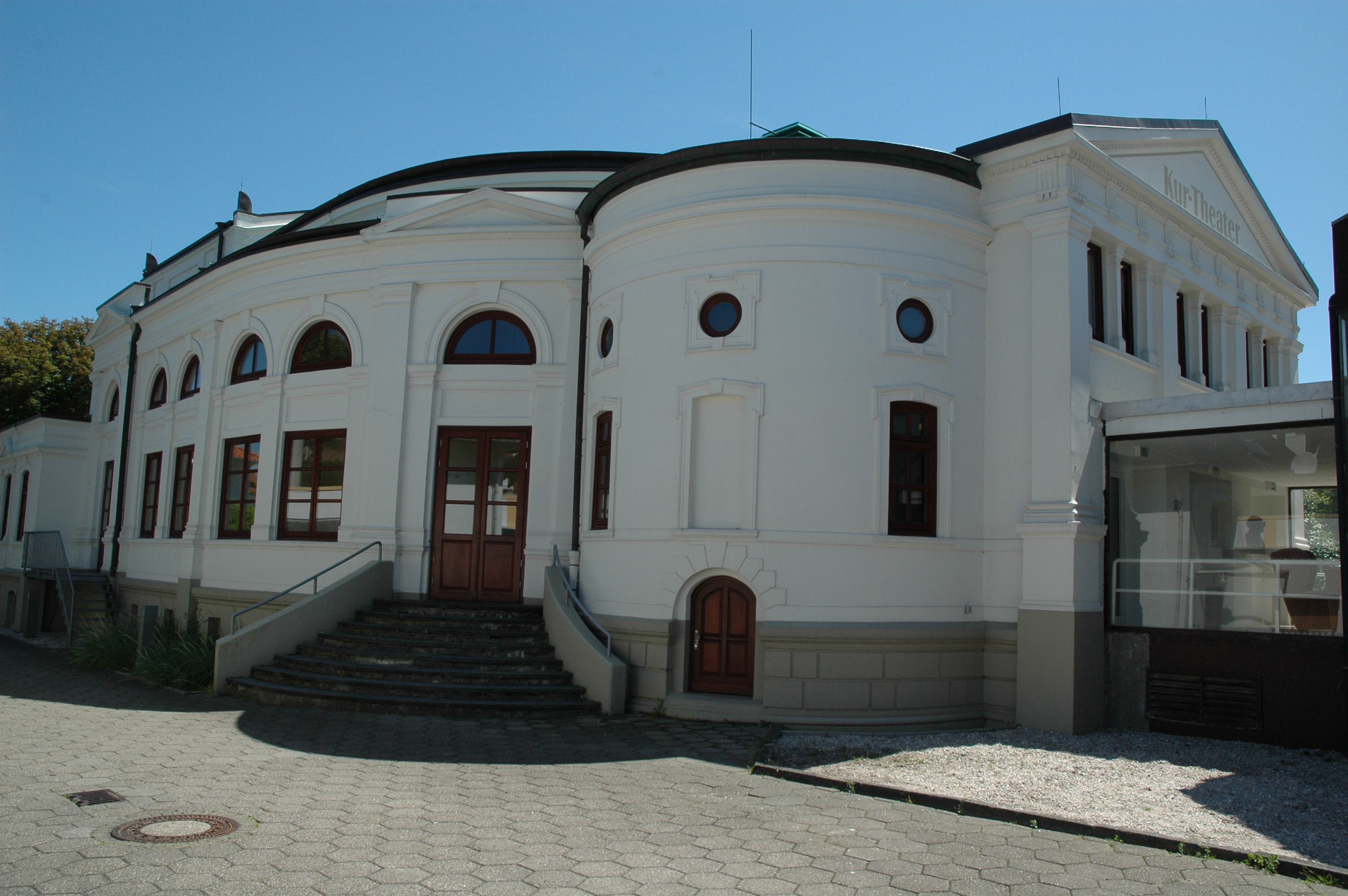
Kurtheater Norderney

Since the mid-1990s, the playing area of the Landesbühne Niedersachsen Nord has been firmly defined. The theater presents its productions on a seasonal basis in a region inhabited by 720,000 people. In the words of artistic director Gerhard Hess, the LBNN plays for a big city in the area.

As a rule, a new production is shown five to eight times at the main venue in Wilhelmshaven and once at each of the other venues. Significant exceptions are possible, however, as in the case of the musical Meta, Norddeich, which was shown six times there alone (as of 2010) due to its reference to the town of Norden.

The venues in detail:

- Wilhelmshaven
  - Stadttheater Wilhelmshaven: The theater is housed in the former naval directorate, a building dating back to 1904. The stage and auditorium are designed as a classic peep-box theater. The auditorium was modernized in 1983 and at the beginning of the 21st century. Up to 514 seats are available in the auditorium. The stage is 18 meters wide and 7 meters deep; the orchestra pit offers space for 52 musicians.
  - Former Junges Theater/Studio: From 1989 to 2015, the building on Rheinstraße was home to the oldest children's and youth theater in Lower Saxony. Smaller studio performances were also presented on the intimate stage without a ramp. The venue had 99 seats. It was ultimately abandoned due to a refurbishment backlog.
  - Theater im Oceanis (TheOs): As a replacement for the studio in Rheinstraße, a new venue for the Junge Bühne and small studio productions with 99 seats was created in 2016 in the completely renovated building of the former Oceanis.
  - Former Provisorium 29: During the renovation of the auditorium of the Stadttheater from summer 2022 to spring 2023, the theater was relocated to a former hardware store. This alternative venue was called Provisorum 29.
- Aurich
  - Stadthalle: In addition to the Landesbühne, other theaters such as the Ohnsorg-Theater also occasionally use the venue, which is otherwise available for concerts and parties. With row seating, 500 seats are available.
- Emden
  - Neues Theater: The Neues Theater was built in 1970 and seats between 600 (musical theater) and 680 people (drama). The stage area is 16.80 m wide and 10.80 m deep.
- Esens
  - Theater in the Theodor-Thomas-Halle: In 1962, the cultural community of the town of Esens succeeded in persuading the Landesbühne Niedersachsen Nord to perform in their town. Since then, the town of Esens has been a permanent venue for the Landesbühne. Plays are performed in the 382-seat theater in the Theodor-Thomas-Halle on Walpurgisstraße.
- Jever
  - Theater am Dannhalm: After the inadequate stage conditions meant that the "Concerthaus" could no longer be used for larger stage productions from the 1970s onwards, the "Theater am Dannhalm" was designed specifically as a venue for the Landesbühne. The venue has 352 seats.
- Leather
  - Theater an der Blinke: The former Emsaula of the vocational schools, with a capacity of 800 spectators, was extensively renovated in 2010 for around 3.3 million euros and received, among other things, a new foyer, new seating and modern stage technology.
- Northen
  - Theatersaal der Realschule, with 450 seats.
- Norderney
  - Kurtheater: The Kurtheater, opened in 1894, is a late neoclassical building by the Hanoverian architect Johannes Holekamp and is a multi-purpose court theater. It has also been used as a cinema since 1923. The theater, which was once designed for around 500 spectators, now has 363 seats.
- Papenburg
  - Forum Alte Werft: The Forum Alte Werft is housed in the former factory halls of the Meyer Werft, which were transformed into a cultural center in 1992 after extensive renovation work. The ensemble includes a theater with 240 seats and the town hall with 800 seats.
- Vechta
  - Metropol: Cinema hall, which is also used for theater evenings, with 272 seats.
- Weener
  - Karl-Bruns-Realschule: School auditorium, which is also used for cultural events, with 290 seats.
- Wittmund
  - Aula im Schulzentrum Brandenburger Straße, with 271 seats.

=== Employees and performances ===
LBNN – Besucherzahlen
Season	Visitors
2005/2006	106,121
2006/2007	102,246
2007/2008	104,128
2016/2017	108,736
2019/2020	73,800

The Landesbühne Niedersachsen Nord employs more than 100 people in the 2014/2015 season. The management of the theater consists of the artistic director Olaf Strieb, the administrative director Torben Schumacher, the director of the Junge Landesbühne, Carola Unser, and the head stage manager Eva Lange. This staff produces over 500 performances for the entire theater area. The performances are spread across nine productions in the evening schedule, which can be seen in all venues, as well as four studio productions and six children's and youth theater productions by the Junge Landesbühne.

After the attendance record from the 1980/81 season was no longer reached and the Landesbühne suffered a further decline in audience numbers in the 1990s, the trend was reversed at the beginning of the new century. Since the 2003/2004 season, performances have once again been seen by more than 100,000 sppeople, including a good 50,000 visitors in Wilhelmshaven alone.

In addition to the theater performances, recitals and readings have been held regularly in the main theater for several years. In the 2009/2010 season, the "Theaterkirche" series of events was introduced, which is a collaboration between the Landesbühne and the Christus- und Garnisonkirche in Wilhelmshaven. In the form of a devotion, pastors and dramaturges approach themes from the current repertoire together.

=== Audience ===
Even the first directors of the Landesbühne, Herbert Paris and Wilhelm Grothe, obtained subsidies for school performances and admission discounts for young people, with long-term success. In the mid-1950s, 1600 young people belonged to various youth visitor organizations; 35 percent of the audience in the theaters were young people. Other directors, such as Georg Immelmann, also made an explicit effort to attract young audiences, which earned them the accusation of wanting to turn the Landesbühne into a pure children's and youth theater.

Visitors of a young age still make up a considerable proportion of the audience, especially in Wilhelmshaven, an important school and university location. Theater subscriptions such as the Junior Six Pack are aimed specifically at pupils and students. In addition, so-called "theater messengers" advertise the Landesbühne at schools and organize visits to the theater. Senior citizens are also part of the regular visitor base in all venues, while the middle generation is somewhat underrepresented. The largest theater-going community in Wilhelmshaven and the surrounding area is the Volksbühne, which celebrated its 60th anniversary in 2007 and is therefore five years older than the theater itself. There are special offers for the unemployed, such as tickets at a greatly reduced price (2 euro; as of September 2011) for recipients.

In recent years, one of the most important marketing instruments of the Landesbühne has developed into the "Kulturkarussell" in Wilhelmshaven, which takes place every summer and begins with a parade of costumed theater people through the city center. In a free season review, the audience is given an insight into the productions of the coming season. They also have the opportunity to take a look behind the scenes and bid for costumes from the Fundus.

=== Status ===
Since the founding of the Ostfriesische Landesbühne in Leer, the special-purpose association and the state of Lower Saxony have contributed to the financing of the institution. During Stromberg's directorship, around 70 percent of the funding was provided by the state and around 30 percent by the special-purpose association. Little has changed in this distribution of funds to the present day. In the 2007/2008 season, the state of Lower Saxony contributed a total of 2.908 million euros to the annual budget of 5.537 million euros, while the special-purpose association contributed 983,000 euros. Due to the positive development in visitor numbers, the Landesbühne was able to reduce its costs by almost 30 percent (compared to 15.9 percent in 1995) selbst erwirtschaften – was bundesweit einen Spitzenwert darstellte.

Dennoch war Anfang 2010 die weitere Finanzierung der LBNN nicht gesichert. Als die Kosten aufgrund von Tariferhöhungen, gestiegenen Energiekosten und teurer gewordenen Bühnenbildmaterialien deutlich anschwollen, passte das Land Niedersachsen seine Zuweisungen der neuen Situation nicht an. Auf diese Weise drohte ein Defizit von 900.000 Euro zu entstehen. Der Zweckverband beschloss daraufhin, seinen Zuschuss drei Jahre lang um jährlich 150.000 Euro aufzustocken, in der Hoffnung, dass das Land diesem Beispiel folgen würde. Trotz gegenteiliger Zusicherungen durch den niedersächsischen Kulturminister Lutz Stratmann wurden die Aufwendungen des Landes jedoch nicht erhöht. The Landesbühne responded with an online petition to the Lower Saxony state parliament, in which it called on the state to end the cultural bleeding of rural areas in the northwest. At the end of May 2010, the state of Lower Saxony promised the Landesbühne additional funding of 140,000 euros for the current financial year. In 2011, a new contract was concluded between the Landesbühne and the state of Lower Saxony. It provides for a "partial dynamization" and not, as demanded by the LBNN, an annual increase in the state subsidy by the amount of the wage increases. As there was a threat of renewed financial shortfalls until 2014, the special-purpose association decided to unilaterally increase its financial contribution.

== Awards ==
- 2nd North German Theatertreffen in Hamburg (1972): Award for the production Victor oder die Kinder an der Macht by Roger Vitrac
- 7th North German Theatertreffen in Hamburg (1977): Special prize for the production Parka, Jeans und 16 Jahre by the Theaterpädagogisches Modell
- 10th North German Theatertreffen in Lübeck (1981): Award for the production Columbus discovers America by Karl Wesseler
- 14th North German Theatertreffen in Göttingen (1985): Award for the production The Caucasian Chalk Circle by Bertolt Brecht
- 14th North German Theatertreffen in Göttingen (1985): Award for actress Elke Münch (for her role as Grusche in Bertolt Brecht's The Caucasian Chalk Circle)
- Author's Prize of the State Stage Group in the German Stage Association to Katharina Gericke for Geister Bahn, 2000
- Rising star of the 1985 season (according to the trade journal Theater heute)
- Nominated for Best theater work away from the centers (by the trade journal Die deutsche Bühne, 2006)
- Nominated for Best theater work away from the centers (by the trade journal Die deutsche Bühne, 2008)
- Nominated for best performance in the category Stage/Space/Costume - Diana Pähler/Andorra - (by the trade magazine Die deutsche Bühne, 2008)
- Nominated for best performance in the field of Directing - Eva Lange/Andorra - (by the trade journal Die deutsche Bühne, 2008)
- Nominated for Best Director Drama - Jan Steinbach/Stella - (Der Deutsche Theaterpreis DER FAUST, 2010)
- He has also been invited to stage productions at major German theaters. For example, the world premiere production of the Völcker play Albertz, directed by Christian Hockenbrink, from the 2008/09 season at Berlin's Maxim Gorki Theater and the Stella production from the 2009/10 season at the Deutsches Schauspielhaus in Hamburg.

== Directors ==
- 1952–1955: Wilhelm Grothe / Herbert Paris
- 1955–1958: Hermann Ludwig
- 1958–1973: Rudolf Stromberg
- 1973–1979: Mario Krüger
- 1979–1994: Georg Immelmann
- 1994–1996: Thomas Bockelmann
- 1996–1998: Arnold Preuß ("Interimistischer künstlerischer Geschäftsführer")
- 1998–2013: Gerhard Hess
- seit 2013: Olaf Strieb

== Literature ==
- Gerhard Hess (Ed.): Theater am Meer. 50 Jahre Landesbühne Niedersachsen Nord und Stadttheater Wilhelmshaven. LBNN GmbH, Wilhelmshaven 2002, ISBN 3-930510-77-4.
- Gerhard Hess, Großstadttheater in der Fläche – Die Landesbühne Niedersachsen-Nord. In: Christian Kirk (Ed.): Wirtschaftsstandort Niedersachsen, Auflage 2009/2010, Darmstadt 2009, ISBN 978-3-938630-64-8.
- Peter Hilton Fliegel: Manchmal ist der Kreis doch ein Quadrat. Gerhard Hess im Gespräch über die Landesbühne Niedersachsen Nord. LBNN GmbH, Wilhelmshaven 2013, ISBN 978-3-941929-04-3.
- Heino Küster: Musik und Theater in Niedersachsen. In: Karl Wiechert (Ed.): Kulturpolitische Initiativen in Niedersachsen. Richard Voigt gewidmet. Verlag für Literatur und Zeitgeschehen, Hannover 1965, p. 105–111.
- Karl Veit Riedel: Stadttheater Wilhelmshaven, Landesbühne Niedersachsen-Nord, Niederdeutsche Bühne Wilhelmshaven. Geschichte und Erinnerungen. Friesen-Verlag Willy Beutz, Wilhelmshaven 1983 (ohne ISBN)
- Bernd Steets: Theateralmanach Spielzeit 2009/2010. Topographie der deutschsprachigen Theaterlandschaft. Edition Smidt, Pullach im Isartal 2009, ISBN 978-3-941537-00-2.
