= Theater für Kinder =

Children's theatre and chamber opera house in Altona, Hamburg, Germany

Coordinates: 53°33′17″N 9°56′31″E

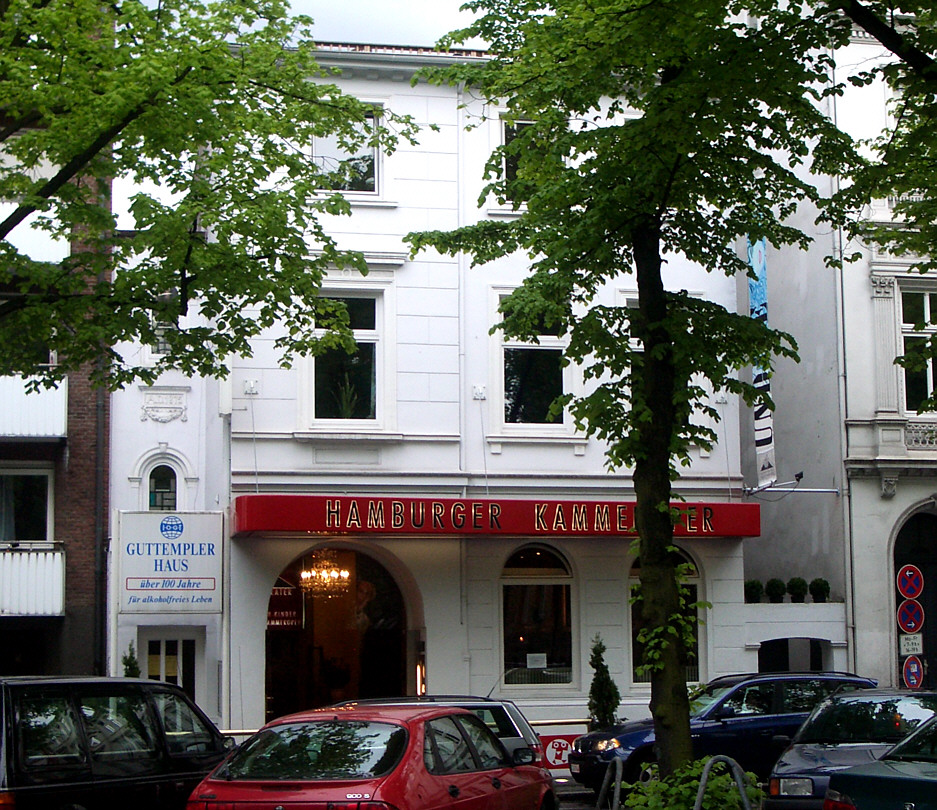
Alleetheater

Theater für Kinder or Allee-Theater is a theatre in Hamburg, Germany. Located in the Max-Brauer-Allee 76 in Hamburg-Altona, it was founded in 1968 as a privately run children's theater by Uwe Deeken. Since 1996 the Hamburg Chamber Opera has performed there under the same management,

The theater has a hall with a stage and auditorium, which is used by children's theater and chamber opera alike. The hall has a capacity of 226 spectators on chairs upholstered in red and gold. At the side is a glass-enclosed courtyard room with a bar and restaurant.
