= Filbinger affair =

Controversy during the Nazi era

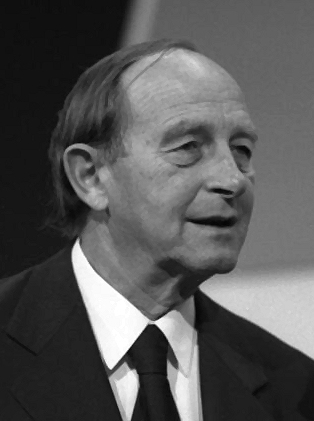
Hans Filbinger in 1978

The Filbinger affair or the Filbinger case in 1978 was a controversy about the behavior of Hans Filbinger (1913–2007) during the Nazi era and his handling of it as Prime Minister of Baden-Württemberg. It began in February 1978 with Filbinger's injunction against the playwright Rolf Hochhuth, who had publicly called him a "terrible lawyer".

As the case progressed, four death sentences were discovered that Filbinger had requested or passed as a military judge in the Navy in 1943 and 1945. He had previously denied three of them and then claimed to have forgotten them, but maintained that they were legal. In the face of growing public criticism, he lost the support of the CDU, of which he had been a member since 1951. He then resigned as Prime Minister on August 7, 1978.

His attempts at rehabilitation, which continued until his death on April 1, 2007, and a controversial eulogy by Günther Oettinger for him kept the memory of the affair alive. It influenced the coming to terms with the past in the Federal Republic of Germany and the rehabilitation of the victims of the Nazi military justice system. Filbinger's behavior during the Nazi era is today seen as an example of the failure of many perpetrators and accomplices among the lawyers of the time.

== Past history ==
=== Military judges during and after World War II ===
Filbinger became a member of the NSDAP during his legal training in 1937 and volunteered as a soldier in the German Navy in 1940. In March 1943 he was appointed to the naval justice system. He worked in five military courts in northern Germany and Norway and took part in at least 234 criminal proceedings. In 169 cases he was directly responsible for the verdict and sentencing as presiding judge, and in 63 cases indirectly as prosecutor or investigator. After the end of the war, he was a British prisoner of war in Oslo and was then employed as a naval judge to supervise camps until February 1946.

This chapter of his biography first became a media topic in 1972, but was not publicly debated nationwide until 1978. Files from 41 cases in which Filbinger was involved, which had previously been ignored, were found in the Kornelimünster branch of the Federal Archives by June 13, 1978, but he did not release them for inspection.

=== Filbinger's trial against Der Spiegel in 1972 ===
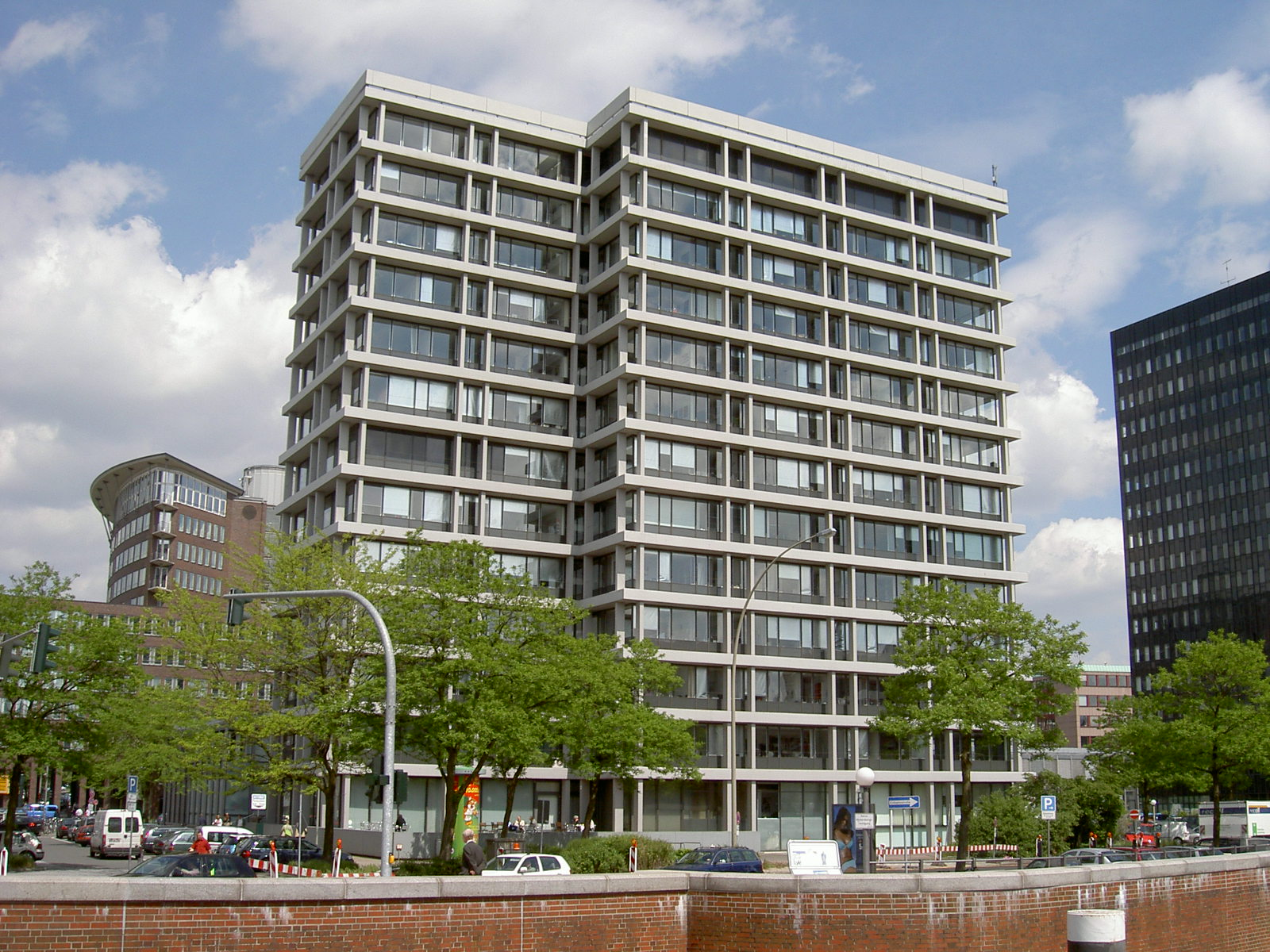
Der Spiegel, editorial office in Hamburg

On April 10, 1972, the magazine Der Spiegel reported on Kurt Olaf Petzold, who, as a prisoner in a British prisoner of war camp, had torn swastikas from his clothing and refused to comply with an order to move, saying: "You've done it now. You Nazi dogs, you are to blame for this war. I'll tell the English what Nazi dogs you are, then my time will come." On June 1, 1945, naval judge Filbinger sentenced him to six months in prison, citing a "high degree of moral deterioration." Petzold had "acted in a destructive and inciting manner for manliness." The term "manliness" came from Prussian military tradition and determined soldier training and military law under National Socialism. In the final phase of the war, Wehrmacht judges, particularly those of the Navy, had justified thousands of death sentences for mostly minor service or disciplinary offenses with a "danger to manliness."

In an interview with Der Spiegel in 1972, Petzold explained that Filbinger had praised "our beloved Führer" before his trial, who "brought the fatherland back to life". Filbinger sued for the injunction against making these statements. He no longer remembers the case, but as a "religious personality" he "actively opposed this regime on many occasions". In 1933 he was excluded from the German National Academic Foundation for anti-Nazi views and later became a member of a well-known anti-regime circle in Freiburg. In addition, as an impartial naval judge, he secured a retrial for the priest Karl Heinz Möbius, who had been sentenced to death for "undermining military morale", in the spring of 1945, in which Möbius was acquitted. For Lieutenant Guido Forstmeier, he averted an impending death sentence by delaying the trial.

Filbinger did not submit any files on these cases; they were not found later either. But both of them testified in writing several times that Filbinger had saved their lives. Adolf Harms, Filbinger's colleague as a naval judge and who had worked at the same military court since 1944, testified that he had "a decidedly negative attitude" toward the Nazi regime. The court upheld Filbinger's claim on August 3, 1972, because it considered the statements quoted by Petzold to be improbable and suspected a mix-up.

=== Filbinger's memorial speech 1974 ===
In memory of the assassination attempt on July 20, 1944, Filbinger, as President of the Federal Council, gave a speech on resistance to National Socialism in the Berlin Reichstag building on July 19, 1974. He first described the background to the assassination attempt and the participants' pangs of conscience. He then explained that during the Nazi era he had been part of the Freiburg circle of friends around the Catholic writer Reinhold Schneider, who had contacts with resistance groups, and had "acted out of the spirit that inspired this circle, accepting the risks that this entailed." Nevertheless, he felt that his actions at the time were a "serious omission" in view of what was necessary. He saw this aptly expressed in the Stuttgart confession of guilt of October 1945, the key sentence of which he quoted. He then described the church struggle of the Catholic bishops and the Confessing Church, which had developed since 1933 into a "total front of resistance" and was aimed at "the National Socialist system itself." Some relatives of executed resistance fighters had already protested against Filbinger's right to speak beforehand.

During the speech, hecklers such as "Nazi", "hypocrite", "Nazi judge" were heard until the shouters were expelled from the hall. The weekly newspaper Die Zeit commented on the incidents with reference to the Petzold case, which became known in 1972: "... anyone who sentences a soldier in a prison camp to six months in prison after the end of the war for 'rebellion against discipline and order' and for 'moral deterioration' has little in common with those who rebelled against the order of that time."

The contemporary historian Peter Reichel compared the speeches and showed the differences between Filbinger's memorial speech and Gustav Heinemann's speech from 1969. Filbinger's appearance and speech presented "a completely different picture". In contrast to him, Heinemann acknowledged the communist resistance, pointed out the undemocratic, German nationalist tradition of the July 20 assassins, described the division of Germany as a consequence of their coming too late and failing, and finally named his own shortcomings during the Nazi era in concrete biographical terms.

== Process ==
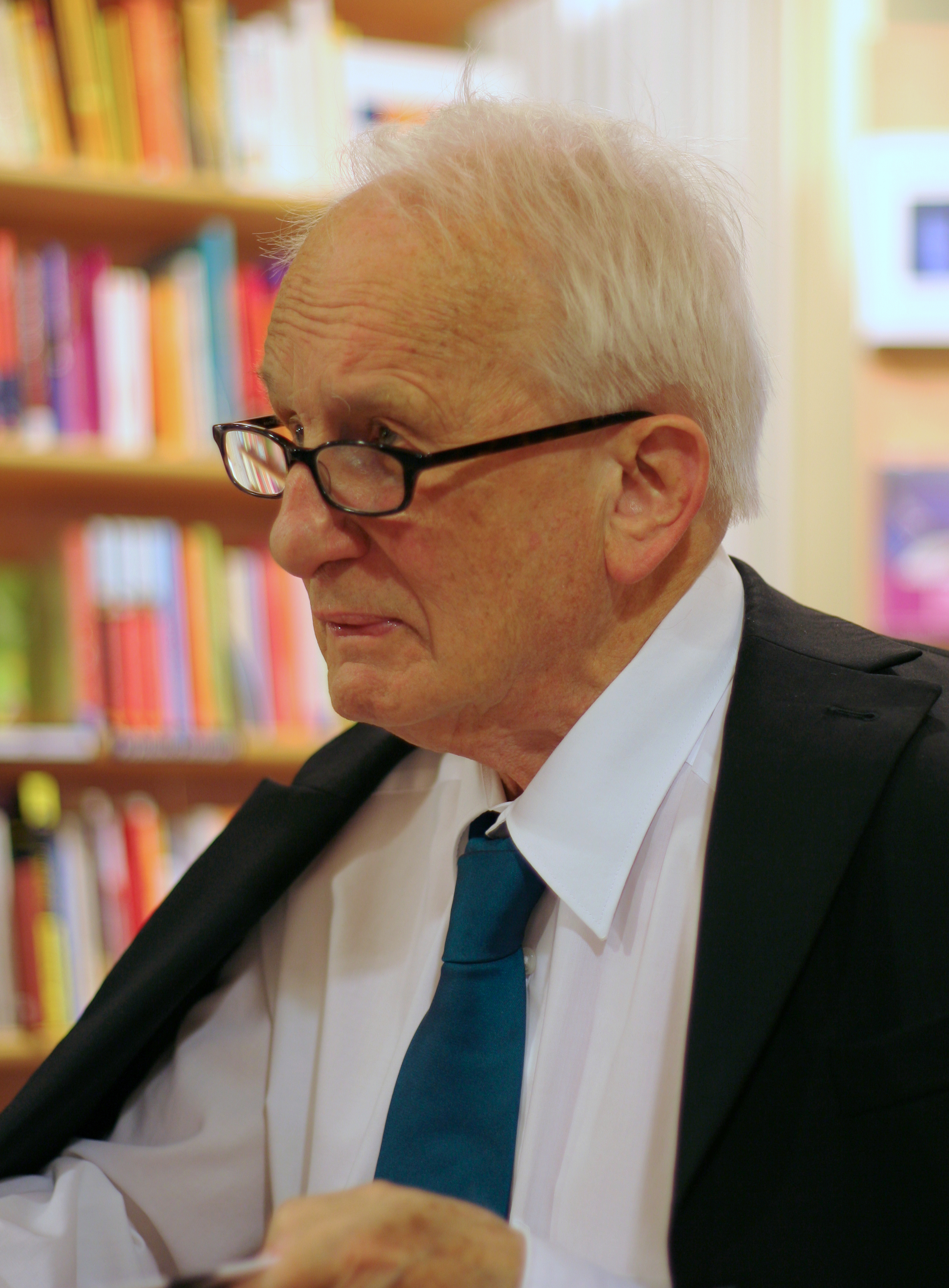
Rolf Hochhuth in 2009

=== Filbinger's trial against Rolf Hochhuth and the time 1978 ===
In an advance copy of his novel Eine Liebe in Deutschland (A Love in Germany) from February 17, 1978, Rolf Hochhuth described Filbinger as "Hitler's naval judge, who even prosecuted a German sailor under Nazi laws while he was still in British captivity after Hitler's death." He was "such a terrible lawyer that one has to assume - because the naval judges were smarter than those of the army and air force, they destroyed the files at the end of the war - that he is only free thanks to the silence of those who knew him."

Following Filbinger's renewed injunction, the Stuttgart Regional Court issued an interim injunction on May 23, 1978, prohibiting the claim that he had only escaped a prison sentence for obstruction of justice. Hochhuth had previously retracted this part of his statements: they were absurd, since no judge of the Nazi era in the Federal Republic had ever been punished for unjust verdicts. The court permitted the remaining statements as free and partly fact-based expression of opinion. This initially seemed to be the end of the affair.

However, Filbinger also wanted to legally compel Die Zeit not to print any of Hochhuth's statements about him. In the course of this process, the Federal Archives in Kornelimünster granted the lawyers on both sides access to the files of the naval courts in which Filbinger had worked. In April 1978, Hochhuth found the Walter Gröger case, which Die Zeit editor-in-chief Theo Sommer presented to Filbinger on May 4. Sommer's lawyer Heinrich Senfft presented it in his plea on May 9, referring to the 1972 verdict and asking who had forced Filbinger, given his alleged anti-Nazi views and his commitment to those sentenced to death, to apply for the death sentence this time and to order its execution.

Erich Schwinge responded with a legal opinion that the Gröger case could not be blamed on Filbinger, either legally or morally. Schwinge was a leading military criminal lawyer during the Nazi era. In his legal commentary on the Military Penal Code, which was tightened in 1940, he had called for the death penalty for "undermining military morale" as a general preventive measure, and as a Wehrmacht judge he himself had imposed death sentences. From 1949 onwards he defended former Wehrmacht and SS members in around 150 trials and influenced West German jurisprudence until 1995 with his thesis that the Nazi military justice system had represented constitutional principles against National Socialism.

On July 13, 1978, the court confirmed the previous ruling and allowed the statements "terrible lawyer", "Hitler's naval judge" and "Filbinger persecuted a German sailor with Nazi laws while he was still in British captivity" as free expressions of opinion. His verdict against Petzold and the request for a verdict against Gröger were not appropriate "for a judge who emphasizes his opposition to the Nazi regime". Although he acted in both proceedings "within the framework of the law in force at the time," he must still accept today's questions about his conduct.

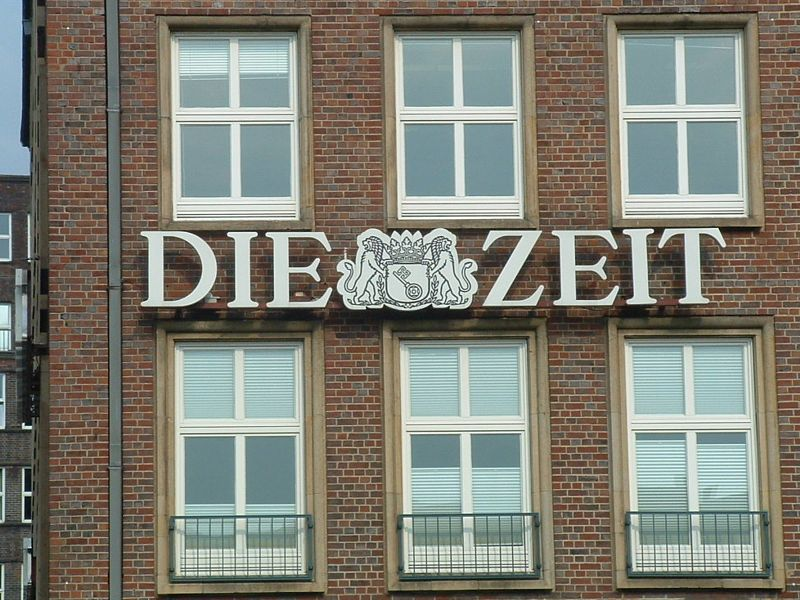
Die Zeit, Press House Hamburg

=== The case of Walter Gröger ===
On May 12, 1978, Die Zeit published details of the trial of 22-year-old sailor Walter Gröger. In 1943, he had hidden for four weeks in Oslo with a Norwegian friend, Marie Lindgren, and considered fleeing with her to neutral Sweden. She told a police officer friend about it, who had Gröger arrested on December 6, 1943. He was sentenced to eight years in prison and loss of military service status on March 14, 1944, for "desertion in the field." His escape plan was not considered attempted desertion abroad because he had retrieved his uniform and thus signaled his intention to return to the troops.

The judge, General Admiral Otto Schniewind, overturned the sentence on June 1, 1944, "because the death penalty should have been imposed." He justified this with Gröger's previous convictions, a "Führer directive" on desertion dated April 14, 1940, and a decree by the Commander-in-Chief of the Navy (ObdM), Karl Dönitz, dated April 27, 1943. The Führer directive demanded the death penalty for attempted escapes abroad and for offenders with a serious criminal record, but also named mitigating circumstances in which a prison sentence would suffice: "juvenile rashness, incorrect treatment at work, difficult domestic circumstances, or other not dishonorable motives." The Dönitz decree, on the other hand, demanded the death penalty for any desertion that was the "failure of treacherous weaklings."

Filbinger was assigned to the case on January 15, 1945, instead of the previous prosecutor after his preliminary investigation. In the main hearing the following day, the court viewed it negatively that Gröger had claimed an Iron Cross and an Eastern Medal as his own. Now his escape plan was interpreted as an attempt to flee abroad. Following the judge, Filbinger applied for the death penalty for Gröger on the basis of the "Führer Directive" because of character weaknesses and previous convictions in the military certificate of good conduct. Defense attorney Werner Schön asked for mercy on his behalf: the court had admitted that according to the applicable military law there had been no attempt to flee abroad. He thus accused the prosecutor and the judge of barely concealed perversion of justice.

On January 22, 1945, Chief Judge of the Navy Adolf Harms sentenced Gröger to death as the "only appropriate atonement." When confirmation of the verdict from Berlin initially failed to arrive, Filbinger made several written and telephone inquiries, thus pushing Gröger's execution forward with unusual determination. On February 27, 1945, the High Command of the Navy (OKM) in Berlin confirmed the death sentence and rejected the request for clemency. The written statement arrived at the Oslofjord on March 15. On the same day, Filbinger ordered the execution, thereby shortening the usual three-day period until the execution. He appointed himself as the senior officer, as was usual for prosecutors. On March 16 at 2:05 p.m. he announced the judge's order to the convicted man and had Gröger sign the receipt. At 4:02 p.m. he had him shot. He was present and, as senior officer, probably gave the order to fire.

Contrary to his duty, Filbinger had not informed Gröger's lawyer of the execution date. The lawyer should have been able to assist his client and decades later expressed his astonishment at Filbinger's failure to do so. Gröger's relatives received no news of his execution. His mother Anna Gröger found out about it in 1954, but the exact circumstances were not revealed until 1978 through Hochhuth, as was Marie Lindgren. After two rejections, the CDU Social Minister of Lower Saxony, Hermann Schnipkoweit, granted Anna Gröger a pension as a relative of a Nazi victim on September 24, 1979, by classifying the death sentence for her son as "an obvious injustice under the circumstances."

=== Filbinger's statements ===
Aware of the impending publication, Filbinger stated on May 4, 1978 that desertion was punishable by death worldwide in 1945 and was "pursued with particular vigor" on all fronts. The fleet commander had therefore demanded the death penalty for Gröger and had therefore not accepted any different verdicts from the outset. The prosecutor had therefore had to apply for this and could not influence Gröger's proceedings as a representative.

He had tried to evade being a naval judge "by any means possible" and had offered to work as a submarine soldier, knowing "that this service was considered a suicide mission." Throughout the Nazi era, he had also "visibly lived out" his "anti-Nazi sentiments" and had therefore experienced "significant disadvantages" professionally since his student days.

As was customary in the West German judiciary up to that point, Filbinger formally equated the Wehrmacht criminal law with the military law of the attacked states, interpreted the last phase of the lost war of aggression as "defense of the fatherland" and thus legitimized the excessive application of Nazi martial law and thus the continuation of war crimes and genocide. He claimed that the lawyers involved had no room for maneuver, including himself, and at the same time declared himself to be an opponent of the Nazis and a victim of Nazi persecution who had risked his life for his anti-Nazi convictions.

On May 10, 1978 and more frequently, Filbinger claimed: "There is not a single death sentence that I have pronounced in my capacity as a judge." Besides, he said that he had not "participated in any other proceedings that resulted in a death sentence" except for Gröger. On May 15, 1978, Der Spiegel quoted him as follows: "What was legal then cannot be wrong today!"

After Gerd Bucerius took up the sentence in the Zeit on June 9, 1978 and related it to "Hitler's laws," Filbinger clarified in the subsequent issue on June 16, 1978: He had not said the sentence like that, but that the Der Spiegel journalists had interpreted his reaction to their accusation that he had bent the law in the Gröger case that way. On September 1, 1978, he stated in the Rheinischer Merkur: "My statement did not refer to the despicable Nazi laws, but to the death penalty for desertion in the field, which had been threatened in the Military Penal Code since 1872."

As Gröger's prosecutor, he had referred to the Führer Directive of 1940, which allowed for a certain amount of discretion. Therefore, it was often understood to mean that "justice had been done back then" and that formally correct judgments made in an unjust state would continue to apply in a constitutional state. This thesis of legal continuity, which was common in the post-war decades, now had the effect of a scandal. Erhard Eppler, then SPD parliamentary group leader and opposition leader in the Baden-Württemberg state parliament, therefore attested that Filbinger had a "pathologically good conscience".

On July 8, 1978, Filbinger admitted at a press conference that he had not shown his concern about the Gröger case in a timely and clear manner.

=== Death sentences announced ===
On May 8, 1978, Spiegel editor Rudolf Augstein asked Filbinger about his involvement in other death sentences. On July 3, 1978, the ARD magazine Panorama reported on two death sentences that he had passed as presiding judge. On April 9, 1945, he sentenced Corporal Bigalske to death for murder in conjunction with mutiny and desertion. On March 15, 1945, Bigalske shot the commander of the harbor patrol boat NO 31 and then fled to neutral Sweden with the rest of the crew. On April 17, 1945, Filbinger sentenced Chief Helmsman Alois Steffen to death for desertion and undermining military morale. Steffen had followed Bigalske to Sweden with the harbor patrol boat NO 21 and a crew of 15. Both sentences could not be carried out because the convicted persons had fled.

This proved Filbinger's previous false statements. He now described the death sentences as "phantom sentences" that could not and should not be carried out and that he had therefore forgotten. He told the then Federal Archivist Heinz Boberach that if a fourth death sentence against him surfaced, he would resign.

On July 27, 1978, an employee of the Federal Archives happened to find an older court file that was not part of the files of naval courts in which Filbinger's involvement had been known up to that point. During the subsequent systematic review of the court's case files, another death sentence was discovered. Filbinger had applied for it as prosecutor in 1943 for looting against a young sailor who had taken some items of little value from a drugstore while cleaning up after air raids on Hanover. The judge had accepted the application. Because the superior military lawyers thought the sentence was excessive, they had commuted it to a prison camp sentence. The sailor did not survive serving this sentence. On August 1, 1978, Federal Minister of the Interior Gerhart Baum, who was kept informed about the archive search, sent Filbinger a list of all the death sentences that had been found so far, without any details, from which the fourth discovery emerged.

On August 3, 1978, the State Ministry of Baden-Württemberg announced the fourth death sentence, but described the course of events as follows: On August 17, 1943, sailor Herbert Günther Krämer was sentenced to eight years in prison for continued looting, then to death. Filbinger had requested the sentence, but at the same time presented the judge with interrogation results that made a pardon legally possible. In the appeal proceedings, as the prosecutor, he then achieved a conversion to a prison sentence. These statements now seemed all the more implausible after he had declared for months that he had not requested or passed another death sentence, and then claimed that he had forgotten the sentences because they were irrelevant. He was now considered in the media to be a "man who forgets a death sentence."

=== Resignation ===
In the Hochhuth trial on May 9, 1978, Heinrich Senfft had given Filbinger the choice of announcing further verdicts himself or "resigning." On May 12, Theo Sommer had asked: "Shouldn't Filbinger resign - or go to Mother Gröger in Langenhagen and make the same purifying bow to the past that Willy Brandt did in Warsaw for the entire German people?"

After Hochhuth's partial success in court, the opposition state SPD demanded Filbinger's resignation as Prime Minister from May 27. The state CDU unanimously rejected this. Helmut Kohl and Heiner Geißler made several declarations of honor for him; the federal CDU unanimously supported him externally until the beginning of July. Internally, it was not his behavior as a naval judge that was criticized, but the form of his public defense: it was too focused on the legal level and did not take the moral level into account. The fact that he did not express any regret about the events at the end of the war was seen by some CDU members as narrow-minded and clumsy.

From July 3, public opinion increasingly turned against Filbinger. Party friends now also publicly criticized his handling of the allegations. In an article on July 10, Norbert Blüm wrote about personal guilt despite being formally right and concluded that communists had the same right to "repent" as NSDAP members. The "Radical Decree", whose stricter application Filbinger had ordered in Baden-Württemberg and which he had tried to enforce as a federal law via the Bundesrat, should be reconsidered as a result of the affair. He should admit "mistakes" because "the self-righteous" cannot be defended.

On July 11, the Federal Archives announced that it had already informed Filbinger on May 24 about further discoveries of files relating to his 1945 verdicts, including the "phantom verdicts". The leading bodies of the CDU and CSU then distanced themselves from him. Die Welt wrote on July 12 that despite the "Nibelung gymnastics of the CDU", Filbinger's political days were "of course numbered"; Matthias Walden commented on ARD the following day that Filbinger's clinging to his office was damaging the "spirit of democracy". Some media (FAZ, July 14, Der Spiegel, July 17) made the expected resignation a topic. Franz Josef Strauß told party friends on July 29 that Filbinger could not be blamed for his behavior at the end of the war, but "you don't conduct trials with rats and blowflies."

Lothar Späth, then leader of the CDU parliamentary group in the Baden-Württemberg state parliament, called a special meeting of his party on July 27, at which the participants once again assured Filbinger of their "critical solidarity". However, after the announcement of the fourth death sentence on August 3, the state committees tried to persuade Filbinger to resign and began the search for a successor.

On the afternoon of August 7, 1978, Filbinger resigned from his office as Prime Minister. He stated: "This is the result of a smear campaign that has never existed in this form in the Federal Republic before. I have been seriously injustice. That will become apparent, if it has not already become apparent." Filbinger had previously spoken to Spiegel journalist Felix Huby of a "left-wing assassination cartel". He saw himself as the victim of a "campaign by left-liberal media" throughout his life. His supporters in the state CDU, his predecessor Gebhard Müller, his successor Erwin Teufel and right-wing conservative and new right authors shared this view.

For Filbinger's critics, he had brought about his own resignation. Theo Sommer criticized the fact that he showed no remorse towards the victims' relatives as being rigid and unrepentant: "He rejects any sense of guilt..." His attitude to the anti-terror laws being discussed at the time was consistent with his applications and rulings as a naval judge: "He remains subservient to the authoritarian state... He has remained a man of law and order..."

Communications scientist Hans Mathias Kepplinger attributes Filbinger's resignation to demands made by conservative media at the time, while contemporary historian Knud Andresen attributes it to a liberalization of the CDU at the time, which, for example, hindered Filbinger's commitment to the Radical Decree. The political scientist Klaus Kamps describes the resignation as a result of Filbinger's failed "scandal management": He reacted with a "salami tactic" and thereby invited even more intensive research into his past. However, it was not his work as a naval judge, but rather the uncovered attempts to cover up the matter that became his snare. Only refraining from lying could have limited the damage to the person involved in the scandal; only being caught doing so makes him uncontrollable.

At the end of March 1979, Filbinger also resigned from his position as one of seven deputy federal chairmen. The Baden-Württemberg CDU appointed him honorary chairman in 1979. He remained on the CDU federal executive board until 1981.

== Aftermath ==
=== Attempts at rehabilitation ===
In the decades that followed, Filbinger attempted to achieve his rehabilitation. To this end, he published his memoirs in 1987, among other things. With the title The Reviled Generation, he declared himself the spokesman for the generation of the Nazi era. In them, he detailed earlier statements that he had been a member of a resistant circle of friends in Freiburg around Reinhold Schneider since 1938. The later Catholic-conservative publicist Karl Färber had testified to this during the denazification process in 1946. For this Christian circle, opposition to the Hitler regime was a "natural prerequisite". He described his service in the Nazi naval justice system as an "aristocratic form of emigration". The conspirators of July 20, 1944 had "intended him for use after the successful assassination attempt on Adolf Hitler". Paul von Hase's son, Alexander von Hase, confirmed this to him in a letter on June 7, 1978.

Reinhold Schneider is known as an opponent of National Socialism. But he, Karl Färber and his circle of friends were not members of the Christian-market liberal Freiburg Circle, founded in December 1938. Filbinger's alleged role in Stauffenberg's attempted coup in 1944 is based only on his own statement regarding Alexander von Hase's unpublished letter. As a result of the Filbinger affair, historians discovered that Paul von Hase himself had been involved in the Wehrmacht's death sentences.

Filbinger also stated that only by maintaining the discipline of the soldiers in the naval justice system was the navy able to rescue millions of East German refugees across the Baltic Sea in the spring of 1945. His lawyer Gerhard Hammerstein falsely claimed in a letter to the editor of the Badische Zeitung on April 4, 1995 that "the sailor G." (Gröger) deserted during the course of this rescue operation. Desertion had endangered the rescue operation.

In 1992, two former officers in the GDR Ministry for State Security (MfS) stated that its Main Directorate for Intelligence had been observing Filbinger since his great election victory in 1976 as a candidate for the office of Federal President, which he won with the slogan "Freedom instead of Socialism". Filbinger then met with one of the two authors, Günter Bohnsack, on 30 April 1993 and then published the transcript of the conversation, signed by him, as an appendix to his memoirs entitled The Truth from the Stasi Files. It stated: "We fought Filbinger through active measures, i.e., we collected material, and launched fake or falsified material to the West." Bohnsack did not say what this material was, when it was created, or who wrote it. Unnamed colleagues had told him, he explained to Filbinger in the presence of a witness from the MAD. He denied that the MfS had supplied Hochhuth in East Berlin with it, as Filbinger wanted to include in the transcript. He and Brehmer had not fabricated any documents containing Filbinger's death sentences and passed them on to Western contacts. West German journalists therefore saw the protocol as an attempt to create the impression of falsified death sentences and thus make themselves into Stasi victims.

Filbinger maintained until the end of his life that he had been the victim of a media campaign and that he had done nothing wrong, so that he did not have to admit guilt. He explained in various interviews in 2002 and 2003: "I should have said openly at the time: 'Not a single person died because of Filbinger.'" - "Anyone who mutinied endangered the whole thing." Parts of the CDU still agree with this view today. In 1978, Helmut Kohl spoke of a "new denazification campaign" and repeated this in his memoirs in 2004, but also emphasized there that Filbinger could have survived the affair "with a human word of regret to the relatives of the victims." He had advised him to do this at the time, but in vain.

The right-wing conservative Weikersheim Study Center, founded by Filbinger in 1979 and headed until 1997, portrayed him as an opponent of the Nazis on its website until 2011. The president of Weikersheim who succeeded him, Wolfgang von Stetten, claimed in the Bundestag in 1997 that Filbinger had been overthrown by a "remotely controlled Stasi campaign" and had since been "completely rehabilitated". Anyone who disputes this is exposing themselves as an "accomplice of the Stasi". Klaus Voss, editor of the Preußische Allgemeine Zeitung, and the then right-wing extremist Andreas Molau saw Filbinger as a "victim of a campaign of hate". His witness Guido Forstmeier defended him in Weikersheim in 2000 and after his death in 2007 in the right-wing extremist National-Zeitung.

In contrast, Ralph Giordano described the Filbinger case as a "shameful example" of the "second guilt" that many Germans had brought upon themselves by repressing and denying their involvement in National Socialism and its crimes after 1945. For Neele Kerkmann and Torben Fischer, Filbinger, through "his immovable attitude of justification, which showed no self-critical reflection of his activities, [...] in the eyes of the sensitized public, embodies an almost ideal type of conservative-authoritarian habitus that promises success in both dictatorship and democracy, which was characterized by a 'pathologically good conscience' (Erhard Eppler) and - as the Süddeutsche Zeitung adds - a 'pathologically bad memory'."

In his eulogy at the state ceremony on April 11, 2007, Baden-Württemberg's then Prime Minister Günther Oettinger took up Filbinger's claim that no one had died as a result of his verdicts, and described him as an "opponent of National Socialism." This sparked outrage and opposition from many victims' relatives, associations, parties and celebrities across the country; some historians spoke of historical falsification. After clear criticism from Chancellor Angela Merkel, Oettinger took back the term "opponent" on April 16. In this context, Filbinger's behavior during the Nazi era and his handling of the reports about it were examined again.

=== Debate about Filbinger's relationship to National Socialism ===
On May 22, 1978, Der Spiegel published excerpts from an essay by Filbinger from March/April 1935, in which he explained the National Socialist criminal law reform that had been prepared at the time in a memorandum by the Prussian Minister of Justice. It was National Socialism, it said, that made the "effective reconstruction of German law" possible intellectually and protected the "national community" through a strong state instead of the individual's civil liberties. As a "blood community," according to National Socialist opinion, this community must also be "kept pure and the racially valuable components of the German people systematically developed." Therefore, the memorandum contains "protective provisions for the race, for the population and public health, [...]." Filbinger continued: "Pests on the people as a whole, however, whose obvious criminal tendencies will repeatedly cause criminal acts, will be rendered harmless." The previous criminal law had failed in this regard because it examined the influences of heredity, upbringing and the environment on the "mental life of the criminal" in order to rehabilitate the "mostly incorrigible" offender, instead of "concerning an impressive and harsh punishment and effective protection of the whole". However, the new law will only have an impact on the people through "living judges"; it therefore requires "the new lawyer who dispenses justice to the people based on knowledge and solidarity with the people", not just according to formal facts and laws.

Filbinger explained in 1978 that he had only reported on the views of his then teacher Erik Wolf, without adopting them. Political scientists and historians nevertheless suspect that elements of the National Socialist ethnic and racial theory, which was reflected in the Nuremberg Race Laws in September 1935, later influenced his verdicts as a naval judge and that even after the German capitulation he was "still very attached to the National Socialist way of thinking". According to military historian Frank Roeser in 2007, the National Socialists only allowed reliable lawyers to work as military judges for them, and it was possible to refuse this position without any disadvantages for oneself. Judge Helmut Kramer wrote in May 2007:

It is pointless to argue about whether Filbinger was a supporter of Hitler at heart. It is also irrelevant whether Hans Filbinger joined the SA and the NSDAP purely as an opportunist and for career reasons, and whether he was just trying to pander to the National Socialists when he spoke in a student magazine in 1935 of 'blood community', 'pests of the people as a whole' and 'racially valuable parts of the German people'. If he had actually seen through the Nazi ideology, this was all the worse. Because then he would have put himself in the service of the unjust state, contrary to his convictions. But perhaps he was still an incorrigible Nazi even after the end of the war...

In a commemorative speech in Brettheim in 1960, Filbinger distanced himself from National Socialist injustice. There, a court martial had hanged the "men of Brettheim" - a farmer who had disarmed members of the Hitler Youth and two officials who did not want to sentence him to death for this - in 1945 shortly before the end of the war. The Ansbach court declared the court martial verdict in a trial against the murderers in 1960 to be legally valid after hearing the convicted war criminal Albert Kesselring and Erich Schwinge as expert witnesses. In response, Filbinger described the hangings as a "crying injustice".

=== Debate about Filbinger's scope for action ===
Whether and to what extent Filbinger had contributed to Gröger's execution became a central issue in the affair. Gröger's former defense attorney Werner Schön stated in a letter to the editor on May 4, 1978 that he did not remember Filbinger's involvement; he had probably only played an extra role. The court did not have to follow the judge's instructions and there were certainly legal arguments against the death penalty. But the prosecutor could only have requested a lesser sentence with new facts. However, these had already been clarified in Gröger's first trial.

On May 8, Rudolf Augstein referred to the War Criminal Procedure Code in force from 1938 to 1945, which strictly limited the judges' authority to issue instructions and required prosecutors to present legal objections to an instruction and to record them in writing if these were not taken into account. Filbinger had refrained from doing this in Gröger's case because, as he confirmed to Augstein, he did not consider the order to be unlawful. Because of his anti-Nazi stance, he had "let hopeless cases pass without hesitation in order to be able to act successfully in more promising cases."

On May 12, Zeit editor Theo Sommer asked whether "effort, courage, perhaps even a little cleverness could have been enough to avert what only seemed inevitable?" Joachim Fest asked in the FAZ on May 26, "whether a less eager obsession with getting things done could not have saved the convicted man's life."

In an essay published in 1980, historian Heinz Hürten said that Filbinger could only request the death penalty because of Gröger's attempts at deception that were uncovered during the trial. As prosecutor, he was also not allowed to influence the judicial review of a request for clemency that followed the verdict. The execution could no longer be delayed after the verdict had been confirmed by the Commander-in-Chief of the Navy. Hürten mentioned another naval prosecutor who, after a death sentence had been passed, had sent a petition to the Commander-in-Chief and, although he received a reprimand, had managed to have the verdict overturned.

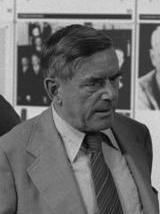
Golo Mann

As early as August 6, 1978, Golo Mann spoke of a "manhunt" against Filbinger. In 1987, he followed Filbinger's memoirs: the death sentence against Gröger had been decided, and his rescue had been "impossible from the outset." Filbinger was not a supporter of Hitler, but of a "liberal constitutional state" that opposed his deployment as a military lawyer. In his office, he then behaved as "humanely" "as he was allowed to." He could well have forgotten two death sentences that were not enforceable anyway. Mann asked whether Hochhuth in 1978 "went through a list of German politicians, studied biographical facts and then decided on the files of a naval judge - or whether he received hints from somewhere else."

On Filbinger's 90th birthday in 2003, historians examined the topic again. Florian Rohdenburg found during research in the Federal Archives that prosecutors and judges in the Nazi military justice system were never punished if they submitted applications or passed judgments that deviated from the court's instructions. Wolfram Wette followed him and said that Filbinger could have told his superiors that he still considered the first-instance judgment against Gröger to be sufficient. In a statement for the second trial, Gröger's military superior had described him as a "hopeless weakling" who "will never fulfill his military duties". In the absence of "manliness", the death penalty could be waived under Nazi military law. Wette attributes Filbinger's failure to consider this to his disdain for Gröger: because of his previous military convictions, he was "of no value to the fighting national community". In contrast, Forstmeier's statement shows that he certainly had room for maneuver to avoid a death sentence.

In contrast, in November 2003, Günther Gillessen, following Hürten and Franz Neubauer, again emphasized the circumstances of the trial at the time: Filbinger had only taken over the case after the investigation into mitigating circumstances had been completed, so he could not help prepare the charges and could not contradict the fleet commander's legal instructions. Only the defense attorney was allowed to make a request for clemency, and only the judge had to present reasons for clemency to the court. Criminal charges filed against Filbinger in 2004 for involvement in death sentences were not pursued further.

Military historian Manfred Messerschmidt said after examining the original files on the Gröger case in April 2007: "Filbinger did not have to demand the death penalty, but he still played along in the proceedings. That was good to secure his position as naval chief of staff judge. We know from other cases that there was no pressure to do so. Filbinger would not even have had to fear disciplinary proceedings if he had decided differently..." For example, Reich Military Court Judge Hans-Ulrich Rottka was only dismissed for his frequent requests for a more detailed examination of the charges in order to avoid hasty death sentences.

According to Helmut Kramer, Filbinger tried to conceal the fact that as a prosecutor he had "demanded an unjust death sentence and thus put the court under pressure". He was one of the "terrible lawyers", but only a typical follower among around 2,500 to 2,800 military judges of the Nazi era.

=== Historical and legal analysis of the Wehrmacht justice system ===
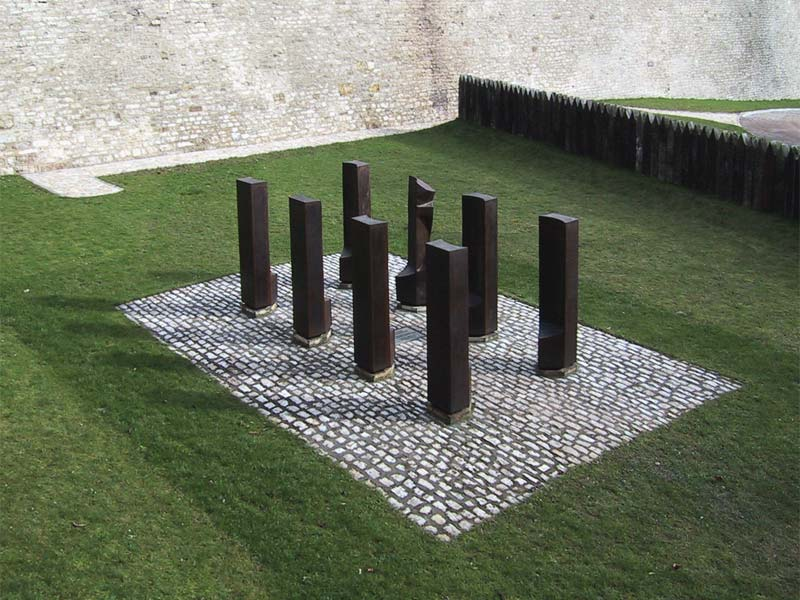
Thomas Nicolai: Memorial to the unknown Wehrmacht deserter, Petersberg Fortress, Erfurt, unveiled in 1995

After Filbinger's resignation, Franz Josef Strauß opened a Bundestag debate on the statute of limitations for Nazi crimes on August 14, 1978 with the accusation: "Collecting material, snooping, looking for dirt, shooting, inciting, character assassination, shooting down was a popular method of the Nazis, whose docile pupils the Reds are today." He called for a general amnesty for Nazi perpetrators. Herbert Wehner's counter-initiative to generally abolish the statute of limitations for murder found a cross-party majority in 1979.

The Filbinger affair intensified the empirical research into the Wehrmacht justice system that had begun around 1966. In 1977, former Luftwaffe judge Otto Peter Schweling and Erich Schwinge had described it as an "anti-National Socialist enclave of the rule of law" and justified the death penalty for juvenile deserters who could even have been acquitted under Hitler's decree. Filbinger has been defending herself with her argumentation since 1978.

In contrast, Fritz Wüllner and Manfred Messerschmidt from the Military History Research Office in Freiburg/Breisgau demonstrated in detail in 1987 that the Wehrmacht justice system was responsible for over 30,000 death sentences and tens of thousands of executions in "seamless adaptation to Nazi legal theory". Without Hochhuth's attack on Filbinger, the authors say, this would hardly have been investigated in more detail. Ingo Müller's book Schreckbare Juristen was published in 1987, which dealt with the role of the Nazi justice system and how the West German justice system dealt with it. In 1988, Heinrich Senfft pointed out in a book on political justice in Germany that the death sentences passed by Nazi judges were not atoned for after 1945.

The Federal Court of Justice (BGH), which had for a long time largely prevented the prosecution of lawyers from the Nazi era, stated on November 16, 1995 in an obiter dictum (Latin for "things said in passing") that the Nazi justice system had abused the death penalty in an unprecedented manner. Its jurisprudence had "not without reason often been described as 'blood justice' in view of the excessive imposition of death sentences." A "large number of former Nazi judges" who continued their careers in the Federal Republic "should have been held criminally responsible for perverting the course of justice in conjunction with capital crimes... The fact that this did not happen represents a serious failure of the German criminal justice system." Lawyers and military historians welcomed this as a departure from old ways of looking at things and a "self-critical assessment of the way the Nazi military justice system was dealt with."

This change gradually made it possible to rehabilitate the victims of the Nazi military justice system and compensate their families, which was demanded above all by the Evangelical Church in Germany. The law on the repeal of Nazi unjust verdicts in criminal justice, passed on July 23, 2002, retrospectively rehabilitated all those convicted as deserters from the Wehrmacht. On September 8, 2009, the Bundestag also unanimously repealed all Nazi verdicts for so-called war treason, which had until then been subject to individual case review.

On June 22, 2007, the Berlin Foundation Memorial to the Murdered Jews of Europe opened a traveling exhibition in Vienna with the title "What was right then... - Soldiers and civilians before the Wehrmacht courts," based on the well-known Filbinger quote. It shows the results of two years of research into the unjust justice of the Nazi era, similar to the Wehrmacht exhibition in Austria and Germany. Federal President Richard von Weizsäcker said at the opening of the exhibition: "The decades-long debates about the motives of the accused obscured the view of the justice system that convicted them. The Wehrmacht courts were an instrument of the National Socialist unjust state."

=== Artistic processing ===
On June 29, 1979, the director Claus Peymann, whom Filbinger had previously forced to resign, performed the play Before Retirement, A Comedy of German Soul by Thomas Bernhard for the first time in Stuttgart. The main character is a former concentration camp commander and later court president who, even as a pensioner, puts on his old uniform every year on Heinrich Himmler's birthday. Like Filbinger, this character of a lawyer also believes that what was once right cannot be wrong today. The drama was inspired by the Filbinger affair and dealt with the theme that the old Nazis have not changed. Although it was not directly based on the affair, it was seen as a response to it and the issues associated with it.

In October 1979, Hochhuth's play Juristen was published, which, following on from his book Eine Liebe zu Deutschland, but more generally addressed the role of Wehrmacht judges during the Nazi era. It was criticized in some quarters as being out of step with the times, sensationalist and artistically worthless.

In 2014, the former editor-in-chief of the Thüringer Allgemeine, Sergej Lochthofen, reported on an interview he had conducted in 1978 with a submarine mate. The mate told him that he had witnessed two death sentences handed down to Filbinger during the war as a trial observer in Norway, both of which were carried out shortly afterwards. In one case, Filbinger had accused an Alsatian of high treason because he saw himself as a Frenchman, not a German, and therefore did not want to take part in the murder. In the second case, he had accused a sailor who, according to a report from a comrade, had been listening to "enemy radio stations". Lochthofen's report on this was not published in the GDR, allegedly in order not to "interfere in the internal affairs of the Federal Republic of Germany".

== Literature ==
Defending

- Bruno Heck (Konrad-Adenauer-Stiftung, Hrsg.), Heinz Hürten, Wolfgang Jäger, Hugo Ott: Hans Filbinger – Der Fall und die Fakten: Eine historische und politologische Analyse. Hase & Koehler, Mainz 1980, ISBN 978-3-7758-1002-9
- Franz Neubauer: Der öffentliche Rufmord. 2., modified and revised edition. Roderer, Regensburg 2007, ISBN 978-3-89783-589-4

Critical

- Wolfram Wette (Hrsg.): Filbinger. Eine deutsche Karriere. Zu Klampen, Springe 2006, ISBN 978-3-934920-74-3
- Helmut Kramer: Hans Filbinger. In: Helmut Kramer, Wolfram Wette (Hrsg.): Recht ist, was den Waffen nützt: Justiz und Pazifismus im 20. Jahrhundert. Aufbau Publishing, Berlin 2004, ISBN 978-3-351-02578-6, p. 43ff.
- Thomas Ramge: Der furchtbare Jurist. Marinerichter Hans Karl Filbinger und sein pathologisch gutes Gewissen. (1978) In: Thomas Ramge: Die großen Polit-Skandale. Eine andere Geschichte der Bundesrepublik. Campus, Frankfurt am Main 2003, ISBN 978-3-593-37069-9 (Buchauszug online)
- Rolf Surmann: Filbinger. NS-Militärjustiz und deutsche Kontinuitäten. In: Dieter Schröder, Rolf Surmann (Hrsg.): Der lange Schatten der NS-Diktatur. Unrast, Münster 1999, ISBN 978-3-89771-801-2
- Heinrich Senfft: Richter und andere Bürger. 150 Jahre politische Justiz und neudeutsche Herrschaftspolitik. Greno, Nördlingen 1988, ISBN 978-3-89190-957-7, p. 16–37.
- Rosemarie von dem Knesebeck (Hrsg.): In Sachen Filbinger gegen Hochhuth. Die Geschichte einer Vergangenheitsbewältigung. Rowohlt, Reinbek bei Hamburg 1983, ISBN 978-3-499-14545-2

Contemporary historical context

- Jörg Musiol: Vergangenheitsbewältigung in der Bundesrepublik. Kontinuität und Wandel in den späten 1970er Jahren. Tectum, Marburg 2006, ISBN 978-3-8288-9116-6
- Norbert Frei: Karrieren im Zwielicht. Hitlers Eliten nach 1945 [Das Buch zur ARD-Fernsehserie]. Campus, Frankfurt am Main 2001, ISBN 978-3-593-36790-3
- Michael Schwab-Trapp: Konflikt, Kultur und Interpretation: eine Diskursanalyse des öffentlichen Umgangs mit dem Nationalsozialismus. Westdeutscher Verlag, Opladen 1996, ISBN 978-3-531-12842-9
