= Georg Maurer =

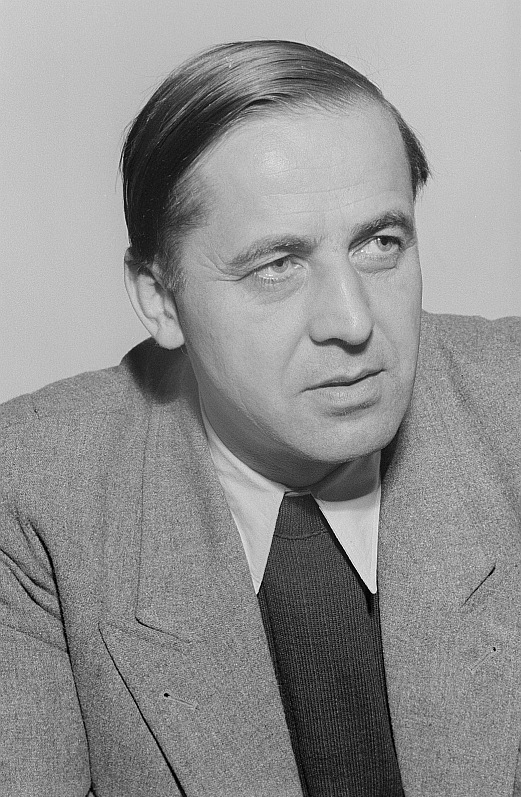
Georg Maurer in 1953

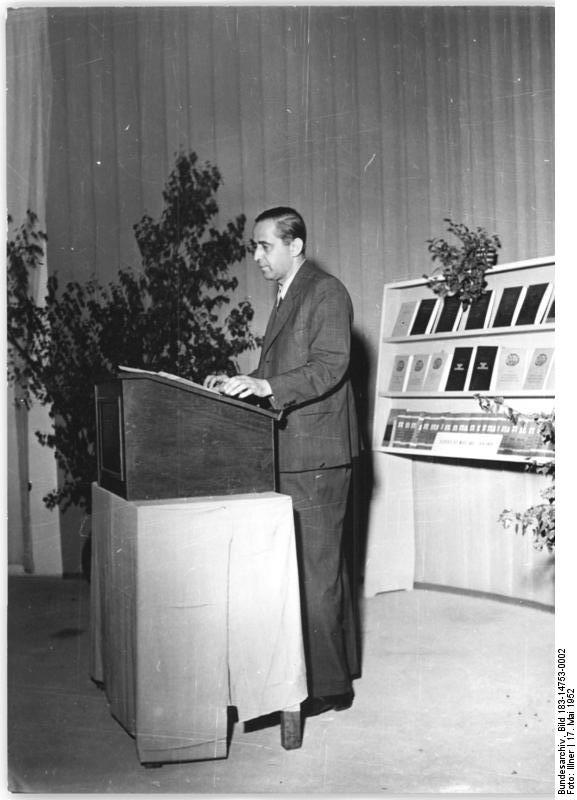
Georg Maurer speaking in Leipzig in 1952

Georg Maurer (11 March 1907 – 4 August 1971) was a German poet, essayist, and translator. He wrote under the pseudonyms Juventus, murus, and Johann Weilau.

The son of a teacher, he was born in Szászrégen, Austria-Hungary (now in Romania), and grew up there before moving to Germany in 1926. He studied art history, Germanistics and philosophy in Leipzig and Berlin until 1932. He was a soldier during the Second World War. From 1955, he was a lecturer, then a professor at the Johannes R. Becher Institute of Literature in Leipzig, where he had great influence on the poets of the Saxon School. He died in Potsdam at the age of 64 and was buried in the Südfriedhof in Leipzig.

== Prizes and awards ==
- Literaturpreis der Stadt Weimar 1948
- Johannes-R.-Becher-Preis 1961
- Kunstpreis der Stadt Leipzig 1964
- Nationalpreis der DDR 1965
- F.-C.-Weiskopf-Preis 1972

== Works ==
- Ewige Stimmen, poems, Haessel Verlag Leipzig 1936
- Gesänge der Zeit, hymns and sonnets, Rupert-Verlag Leipzig 1948
- Barfuß by Zaharia Stancu, translation, 1951
- Zweiundvierzig Sonette Aufbau Verlag Berlin 1953
- Die Elemente, poems, Insel Verlag Leipzig 1955
- Gedichte aus zehn Jahren, Verlag Volk und Welt Berlin 1956
- Der Dichter und seine Zeit, essays and reviews, Aufbau Verlag Berlin 1956
- Eine stürmische Nacht by Ion Luca Caragiale, translation, Insel Verlag 1956
- Lob der Venus, sonnets, Verlag der Nation Berlin 1956
- Poetische Reise Verlag der Nation Berlin 1959
- Das Lächeln Hiroshimas by Eugen Jebeleanu, translation, Verlag der Nation 1960
- Ein Glückspilz by I. L. Caragiale, translation, Aufbau Verlag 1961
- Dreistrophenkalender, poems, Mitteldeutscher Verlag Halle 1961 ISBN 3-354003-67-7
- Das Unsere, in the series neue deutsche literatur, Heft 8 1962
- Gestalten der Liebe, poems, Mitteldeutscher Verlag Halle 1964
- Stromkreis, poems, Insel Verlag Leipzig 1964
- Im Blick der Uralten, poems, Insel Verlag 1965
- Gespräche, poems, Mitteldeutscher Verlag Halle 1967
- Essay I, Mitteldeutscher Verlag Halle 1969
- Kreise, poems, Mitteldeutscher Verlag Halle 1970
- Erfahrene Welt, poems, Mitteldeutscher Verlag Halle 1972
- Essay II, Mitteldeutscher Verlag Halle 1973
- Ich sitz im Weltall auf einer Bank im Rosental (ed. Eva Maurer) Connewitzer Verlagsbuchhandlung 2007 ISBN 3-937799-22-2

== Bibliography ==
- Ursula Püschel: Die Liebe der Dichter: Georg Maurer. In neue deutsche literatur 1988, issue 8, p. 115–147.
- Wolfgang Emmerich: Georg Maurer. In Heinz Ludwig Arnold (Hrsg.): Kritisches Lexikon zur deutschsprachigen Gegenwartsliteratur. Das KLG auf CD-ROM. Zweitausendeins, Frankfurt 2007, ISBN 978-3-86150-692-8 (with comprehensive bibliography).
- Franka Köpp/Roland Lampe/Sabine Wolf (Bearb.): Georg Maurer. 1907–1971. Stiftung Archiv der Akademie der Künste, Berlin 2003, ISBN 3-831145-67-9.
