= Inge Lammel =

German woman musicologist (1924–2015)

Inge Lammel (née Rackwitz; 8 May 1924 – 2 July 2015) was a German women musicologist, which dealt mainly with industrial folk music. She fled to Great Britain as a Jew in 1939 and became known for her work on the persecution of the Jews during the period of National Socialism in Berlin-Pankow.

== Life ==
Rackwitz was born into a Jewish family in the Berlin district Prenzlauer Berg. Her father was a bank clerk and directed several synagogue choirs. In 1933, he was dismissed like all other Jewish employees. She attended primary school and later, like her older sister, the Höhere Töchterschule in Berlin-Lankwitz. Occasionally, as Jews, they were beaten on their way to school or were subjected to other forms of discrimination. During the arrests after the 1938 Kristallnacht, her father was also deported to the Sachsenhausen concentration camp. Her parents were later murdered in the KZ Auschwitz.

Inge and her sister Eva were able to reach the United Kingdom in 1939 with other Jewish children and young people in a Kindertransport. They were taken in by female teachers in Sheffield.

In 1940, she was interned as an "enemy alien" and spent six weeks on the Isle of Man. She was then trained as a nurse and kindergarten teacher in Bristol. In 1944, she moved to London, where she met German political refugees and joined the Communist Party of Germany in 1946. She also worked for the Free German League of Culture in Great Britain and in the Free German Movement.

In autumn 1947, she returned to East Berlin. Inspired by the musicologist Ernst Hermann Meyer, who had also returned from British exile, she studied musicology at the Humboldt University in Berlin from October 1948. In 1950, she married and took the name Lammel. The marriage produced two children. Lammel received her doctorate in 1975 on the subject of the workers' song. She built up the Arbeiterliedarchiv at the Academy of Arts, Berlin of the German Democratic Republic and directed it from 1954 to 1985, during which time she brought out numerous collections of Revolutionary songs. From 1991 onwards, she researched the fate of Jewish families in Berlin-Pankow. She was co-founder of the Pankow Union of Persecutees of the Nazi Regime.

In 2006, Lammel was one of the supporters of the "Berlin Declaration" of the initiative "Shalom 5767 - Peace 2006", which advocates a Palestine policy in accordance with the principles of humanism and international law.

== Awards and honours ==
- 1966: Kunstpreis des FDGB.
- 1971: Hanns Eisler Prize (together with Jürgen Elsner)
- From November 2011 until her death, Lammel was Honorary chairwoman of the Berlin regional association of the Union of Persecutees of the Nazi Regime.
- 2012: Order of Merit of the Federal Republic of Germany

== Work ==
=== Lieder collections ===
- Lieder der Revolution von 1848. Hofmeister, Leipzig 1957
- Lieder gegen Faschismus und Krieg. Hofmeister, Leipzig 1958
- Lieder der Agitprop-Truppen vor 1945.Hofmeister, Leipzig 1959
- Lieder zum ersten Mai. Hofmeister, Leipzig 1959
- Lieder der Arbeiterkinder. Hofmeister, Leipzig 1960
- Lieder der Arbeiterjugend. Hofmeister, Leipzig 1960
- Lieder der Partei. Hofmeister, Leipzig 1961 (with Günter Hofmeyer)
- Lieder des Roten Frontkämpferbundes. Deutsche Akademie der Künste, Berlin 1961
- Lieder aus den faschistischen Konzentrationslagern. Hofmeister, Leipzig 1962 (with Günter Hofmeyer)
- Kämpfen und Singen. Zentralhaus für Kulturarbeit der DDR, Leipzig 1965
- Kopf hoch, Kamerad. Dokumente aus faschistischen Konzentrationslagern. Henschel, Berlin 1966
- Songs für Vietnam. Deutsche Akademie der Künste, Berlin 1966
- Hundert Jahre deutsches Arbeiterlied. Eine Dokumentation. Deutsche Akademie der Künste, Berlin 1966 (Textheft zur gleichnamigen Doppel-LP von Eterna)
- Mit Gesang wird gekämpft. Lieder der Arbeiterbewegung. Dietz, Berlin 1967
- Lieder der deutschen Turn- und Sportbewegung. Hofmeister, Leipzig 1967
- Das Arbeiterlied. Reclam, Leipzig 1970 (also Röderberg, Frankfurt 1973)
- Hundert proletarische Balladen 1842–1945. Verlag Neues Leben, Berlin 1975 (with Ilse Schütt; also Damnitz, Munich 1975)
- Kampfgefährte – unser Lied. Tribüne, Berlin 1978
- Wir packen's an. Politische Lieder aus der BRD. Lied der Zeit, Berlin 1978
- Lied und politische Bewegung. Zentralhaus-Publikationen, Leipzig 1984
- Und weil der Mensch ein Mensch ist. Deutscher Verlag für Musik, Leipzig 1986
- Sachsenhausen-Liederbuch. Edition Hentrich, Berlin 2000, ISBN 3-89468-162-4 (with Günter Morsch)

=== Work ===
- Bibliographie der deutschen Arbeiterliedbücher 1833–1945. Deutscher Verlag für Musik, Leipzig 1977.
- Das Jüdische Waisenhaus in Berlin. Seine Geschichte in Bildern und Dokumenten. Verein der Förderer und Freunde des ehemaligen Jüdischen Waisenhauses in Pankow, Berlin 2001, ISBN 978-3-980857-71-0, DNB-IDN 1055916849.
- Alexander Beer: Baumeister der Berliner Jüdischen Gemeinde. Stiftung Neue Synagoge Berlin, Centrum Judaicum. Hentrich und Hentrich, Teetz, Berlin 2006, ISBN 3-938485-20-5 (Jüdische Miniaturen. Vol. 41).
- Arbeiterlied – Arbeitergesang. Hundert Jahre Arbeitermusikkultur in Deutschland. Aufsätze und Vorträge aus 40 Jahren 1959–1998. Hentrich und Hentrich, Berlin 2002, ISBN 3-933471-35-4.
- Jüdische Lebenswege, ein kulturhistorischer Streifzug durch Pankow and Niederschönhausen. Edited by Förderverein Ehemaliges Jewish Orphanage Berlin-Pankow with Rudolf Dörrier ... 2nd edition, Hentrich & Hentrich, Berlin 2007, ISBN 978-3-938485-53-8.
