= Elise Riesel =

Austrian linguist

- Born: 12 October 1906; Vienna, Austria-Hungary
- Died: 28 September 1989 (aged 82); Moscow, USSR
- Awards: 1963 F.-C.-Weiskopf-Preis

Academic background
- Education: University of Vienna (PhD)

Academic work
- Discipline: Linguist
- Sub-discipline: Stylistics

Elise Riesel (born Elise Grün) or also Eliza Genrichovna Rizel (born 12 October 1906 in Vienna; died 28 September 1989 in Moscow), was an Austrian linguist.

== Life ==
Riesel was born to medical doctor Heinrich Grün and music teacher Matilde Grün, née Goldstein. Riesel was Jewish. In 1932 she married Josef Riesel, an engineer.

== Education and career ==
Riesel finished high school in Vienna in 1925. In 1930, she completed a PhD in philosophy at the University of Vienna. Following the Austrian Civil War, Riesel moved to the Soviet Union. In 1945, she briefly returned to Vienna and taught at the university there, before returning to Moscow. In 1963 she was awarded the F.-C.-Weiskopf prize. She was also awarded the Ehrennadel in Gold. Riesel retired in 1982.

Riesel is known for her contributions to functional stylistics.

== Publications ==
- Riesel, Elise. 1959. Stilistik der deutschen Sprache. Moskau: Verlag für fremdsprachige Literatur
- Riesel, Elise. 1929. Das neulateinische Drama der Protestanten in Deutschland vom Augsburger Religionsfrieden bis zum Dreißigjährigen Krieg. Diss. Wien.
