= Hanns Eisler Prize =

German music prize

The Hanns Eisler Prize was an East-German music award, named after the composer Hanns Eisler. It was awarded by Radio DDR – with advisory participation of the music section of the Akademie der Künste der DDR in Berlin (East) and the Verband der Komponisten und Musikwissenschaftler der DDR (VDK) – and on the occasion of his 70th birthday on 6 July 1968, the first time in the ballroom of the Alten Rathaus. The Hanns Eisler Prize was endowed with 10,000 marks and was one of the most renowned music prizes in the German Democratic Republic.

== Statute ==
The statutes stated: "The Hanns Eisler Prize shall be awarded for new compositions and musicological works which make outstanding contributions to the socialist musical culture of the GDR". Thus, one or more composers (in the category "composition") and musicology were honoured (from 1971 in the category "scientific papers"). The prize-winning pieces were then premiered in a special concert.

Among the first prize winners in 1968 were Peter Dorn, Gerhard Rosenfeld and Ruth Zechlin. The composers Reinhard Pfundt, Gerhard Rosenfeld and Udo Zimmermann each received two awards. In 1990 and 1991, the prize was awarded by the Deutschlandsender Kultur, most recently to Klaus Martin Kopitz and Hans Tutschku. Since 1993, the Hanns Eisler Komponisten Forum und Hanns Eisler Aufführungspreis has been awarded by the Hochschule für Musik "Hanns Eisler" to young performers and composers.

== Laureates (1968–1991) ==
Distinguished by Radio DDR 2:

- 1968: Peter Dorn, Gerhard Rosenfeld and Ruth Zechlin
- 1969: Siegfried Matthus and Wolfgang Strauß
- 1970: Gerhard Rosenfeld
- 1971: Jürgen Elsner and Inge Lammel
- 1972: Gerhard Tittel, Peter Wicke und Udo Zimmermann
- 1973: Friedrich Goldmann, Rainer Kunad, Hans-Joachim Schulze and Udo Zimmermann
- 1974: keine Verleihung
- 1975: Frank-Volker Eichhorn, Winfried Höntsch and Friedrich Schenker
- 1976: Willy Focke
- 1977: Manfred Schubert and Manfred Weiss
- 1978: Paul-Heinz Dittrich and Thomas Böttger (recognition: Joachim Gruner and Bert Poulheim)
- 1979: Manfred Grabs, Peter Herrmann, Bert Poulheim and Gisela Steineckert
- 1980: Wilfried Krätzschmar, Günter Neubert and H. Johannes Wallmann
- 1981: Thomas Ehricht, Bernd Franke and Heinz Weitzendorf
- 1982: Gerd Domhardt and Thomas Hertel
- 1983: Rainer Böhm, Reiner Dennewitz and Hans-Peter Jannoch
- 1984: Ralf Hoyer, Burkhard Meier, Reinhard Pfundt and Kurt Dietmar Richter
- 1985: Günter Mayer (recognition: Reinhard Wolschina and Helmut Zapf)
- 1986: Gottfried Glöckner, Fritz Hennenberg and Reinhard Pfundt
- 1987: Walter Thomas Heyn and Helmut Zapf
- 1988: Reinhard Wolschina and Olav Kröger (recognition: Siegfried Witzmann)
- 1989: Johannes Schlecht, Steffen Schleiermacher and Frank Schneider (recognition: Lutz Glandien and Hartmut Wallborn)

Awarded by Deutschlandsender Kultur:

- 1990: Christian Münch, Helmut Oehring and Annette Schlünz
- 1991: Klaus Martin Kopitz, David Citron and Hans Tutschku
