= Phil Donkin =

British jazz bassist

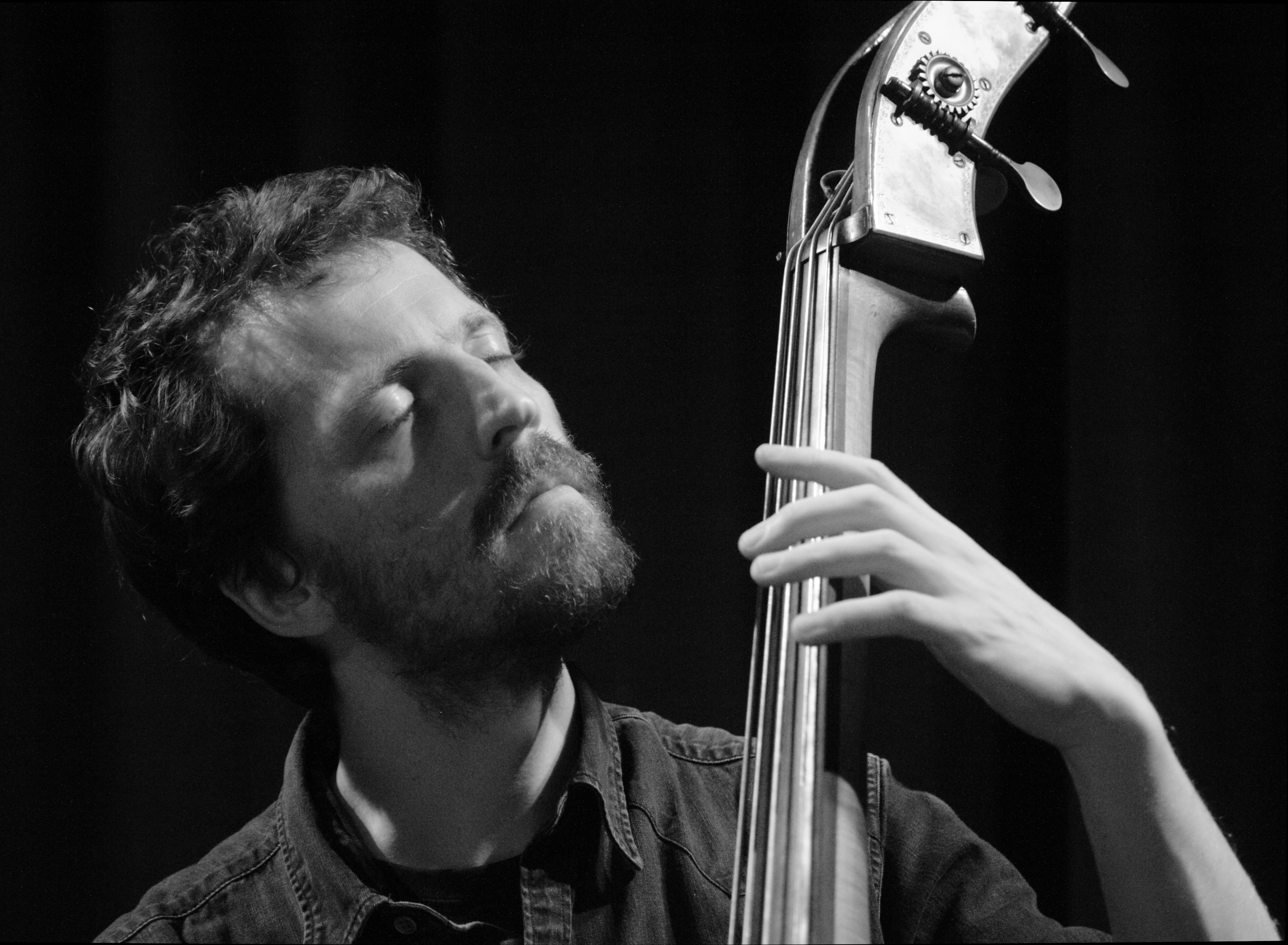
Photo of Phil Donkin

Phil Donkin (born November 1980 in Sunderland, England) is a British jazz bassist.

Donkin began playing electric bass at 12 years old. At 17 he unsuccessfully auditioned for the then-vacant bass player position in the British band Jamiroquai. At 19 he then moved to London to study at the Guildhall School of Music and Drama where he completed a degree in music. It was here that he began playing the acoustic bass, where this became the instrument he played exclusively.

After graduating in 2003, Donkin was active in the London jazz scene. He worked with musicians such as Kenny Wheeler, Julian Arguelles, Tim Garland, Stan Sulzmann and Gwilym Simcock.

In the years that followed, Donkin toured Europe with people such as John Abercrombie, Marc Copland, Bill Stewart, Greg Osby, Kurt Rosenwinkel, Chris Speed, Ari Hoenig, Jonathan Kreisberg, Terell Stafford, David Binney, Tyshawn Sorey and many others. He also performed with some jazz legends such as Quincy Jones, Roger Kellaway and Eddie Henderson.

In 2010, Donkin moved to New York City, where he, played with artists including Ben Monder, Kevin Hays, Adam Rogers, Mark Turner, Seamus Blake, Steve Cardenas, Bruce Barth, Edward Simon.

As of 2013, Donkin was based in both Germany and New York.

Donkin is a member of many projects in Europe, such as Dhafer Youssef's Bird's Requiem featuring Eivind Aarseth and Nils Petter Molvaer. He is a member of Rainer Böhm's trio, and a collaborative quartet featuring Pablo Held, Johannes Enders and Nasheet Waits. He also plays regularly with Nils Wogram's 'Root 70', Marius Neset's 'Birds' quartet, the Ben Kraef Trio and the Max von Mosch Tentet.

Donkin has led projects as a band leader, releasing the album Dimaxis in 2006 and the album The Gate in 2015.
