= Winfried Höntsch =

German musicologist (1930–2022)

Winfried Höntsch (9 June 1930 – 30 January 2022) was a German musicologist and venue director.

== Life and career ==
Born in Dresden, Höntsch studied musicology at the Humboldt University of Berlin and the Hochschule für Musik "Hanns Eisler". From 1956, he worked in the music department of the Ministry of Culture (GDR) in Berlin. In 1962, he became first dramaturge at the Staatsschauspiel Dresden. In 1968 he took over the artistic direction of the Kulturpalast. From 1970 to 1976, he worked in the Philosophy and Cultural Studies section of the Technical University of Dresden and received his doctorate in 1975. From 1976 to 1991, he was director of the Dresden Music Festival. Höntsch died on 30 January 2022, at the age of 91.

== Awards ==
- 1975: Hanns Eisler Prize

== Publications ==
- editor: Hanns Eisler. Eine Auswahl von Reden und Aufsätzen. 2nd edition, Reclam, Leipzig 1961.
- Richard-Strauss-Ehrung der Staatstheater Dresden. Aus Anlaß des 100. Geburtstages des Komponisten. 7.-21. Juni 1964. Staatstheater, Dresden 1964.
- with Ursula Püschel: 300 Jahre Dresdner Staatstheater. Henschel, Berlin 1967.
- edited with Horst Seeger: Klingendes Dresden. Die Dresdner Musikfestspiele in ihrem ersten Jahrzehnt. Deutscher Verlag für Musik, Leipzig 1988, ISBN 3-370-00261-2.
- Opernmetropole Dresden. Von der Festa Teatrale zum modernen Musikdrama. Ein Beitrag zur Geschichte und zur Ikonographie der Dresdner Opernkultur. Verlag der Kunst, Huseum 2004, ISBN 3-86530-025-1.
