= The Jewish Orphanage in Frankfurt =

Former orphanage in Frankfurt, Germany

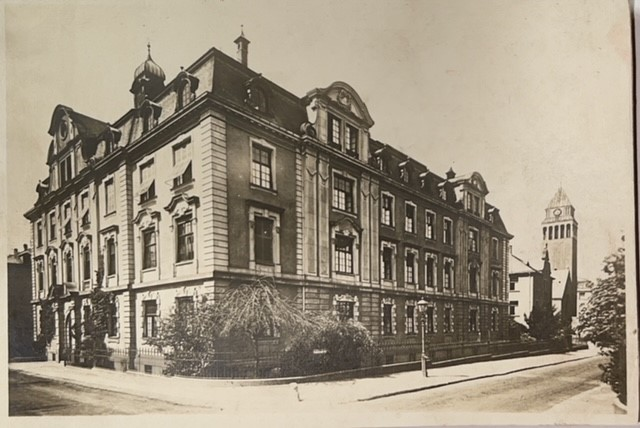
- The Jewish Orphanage in Frankfurt, 1932

General information
- Completed: 1874

The Jewish Orphanage in Frankfurt (German: Israelitische Waisenhaus Frankfurt [informally]; Israelitische Waisenanstalt Frankfurt [formally]) was an orphanage in Frankfurt, Germany, established in 1874 and served as a refuge for Jewish orphans. The orphanage belonged to the welfare association of the Jewish community.

During the Nazi regime, the number of children in the orphanage steadily increased. During these years, especially after Kristallnacht, Isidor and Rosa Marx, who were the directors of the orphanage at the time, worked tirelessly to transport as many of the orphanage children beyond the borders of Germany. Thanks to the efforts of the Marx couple, around a thousand children were saved. Rosa had all the necessary documents to leave Germany, but she chose to stay with the children, and perished in the Holocaust. However Isidor and their three children survived.

The orphanage was closed by the Nazis in July 1942.

== History ==
In the 19th century, charitable and benevolent activities were prevalent in the Jewish community in Germany. The Jewish Orphanage in Frankfurt was established through the contributions of private individuals and wealthy donors, and its upkeep was made possible by donations.

Founded to serve the needs of impoverished Jewish boys, the orphanage offered comprehensive care, encompassing both physical and emotional well-being, alongside educational opportunities. Initially, only children from the city of Frankfurt were accepted, and later, from more distant places as well. A child was considered an orphan even if he had a mother but there was no father at home. Starting in 1884, girls were also admitted to the orphanage, and were accommodated in a separate building. The orphanage accepted children aged 6–12.

In 1903, a new and spacious building was erected at Röderbergweg 87 with funds donated by Hannah Mathilde of the Rothschild family and her daughters. The Rothschild family also paid for the maintenance of the new building, which was furnished with good quality, modern furniture, and was designed to house 75 children.

== Orphanage staff ==
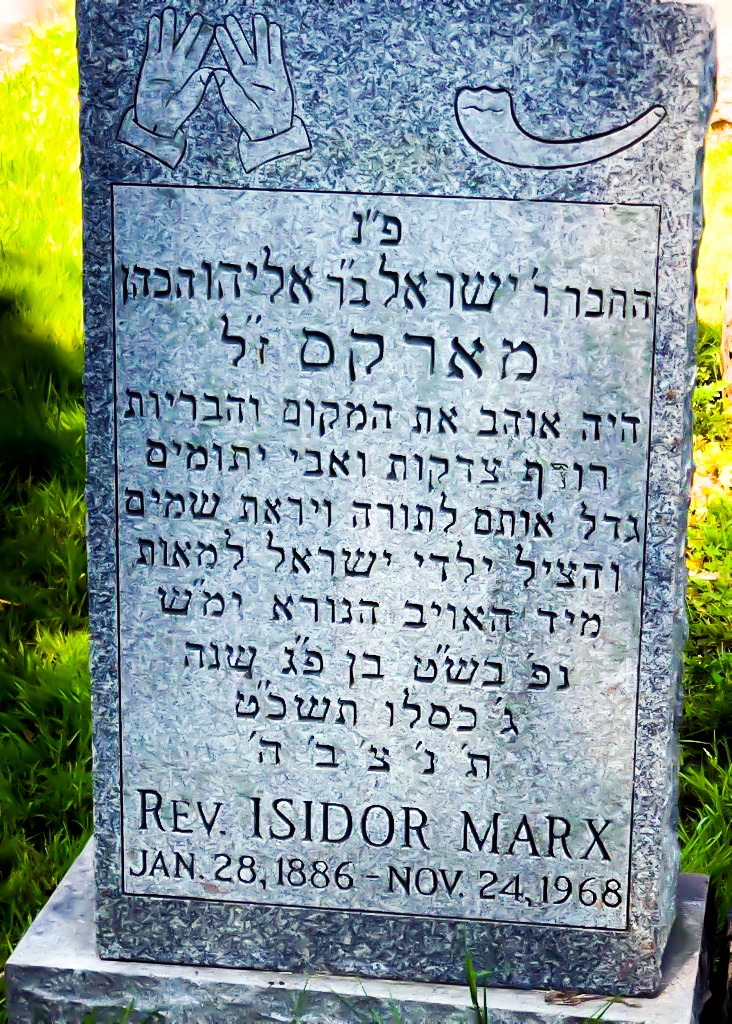
The headstone of Isidor Marx

In 1908, the orphanage was managed by Feist Zondheimer.

From 1918 until it closed, the place was managed by Isidor (Yisrael Hacohen) and Rosa Marx, who were educators by profession. The directors created the atmosphere of a warm home, like one big family. The children called them Uncle Isidor and Aunt Rosa. Isidore and Rosa Marx got married in 1912 and had three children: Hana (1913), Esther (1915) and Moshe (1916). Isidore served in World War I in German Army, in the infantry. During the war, he fell ill with severe nephritis and spent 8 months in a military hospital. The couple began managing the orphanage in 1918, immediately after the end of World War I.

Regina Levitus ran the kitchen, and her four children lived with her in the orphanage. Her three daughters survived, but Regina and her son Yosef perished in the Holocaust.

Ella Schwartzstein, known to the children as "Aunt Ella," was in charge of the girls in the orphanage. She had previously taught at the Evelina de Rothschild School in Jerusalem. During her time in Germany, she continued to visit Israel. On one of her visits, she brought silver jewelry created at the Bezalel Academy of Arts and Design. She received the jewelry for the girls from Dr. Moshe Wallach, the director of the hospital he founded which bore his name, later became known as "Sha'arei Tzedek."

Emma Elsa Rothschild studied at the orphanage in her childhood. From 1921, she managed the Rothschild Children's Hospital in Frankfurt until its forced closure by the Nazis in June 1941. From July 1941, Emma headed the girls' section of the orphanage until she was sent to a concentration camp that same year.

== Orphanage structure ==
The orphanage, on Röderbergweg Street, was a four-story building. The second floor housed the boys, and the girls lived on the ground floor. The directors and their families lived on the upper floor and the door to their apartment was open for the children at all hours.

The orphanage had a synagogue, which people from the surrounding neighborhood also attended. The orphans earned a little money by reciting the "Kaddish" in memory of the deceased on Yahrzeit. In the basement of the building, there was a kitchen reserved for Passover.

== Lifestyle ==
The alumni of the orphanage attested that the Marx family ran it like one large extended family. The orphanage supported a religious way of life with three kitchens: meat, dairy, and an additional kitchen for Passover. Bar Mitzva celebrations were held for thirteen-year-old boys, including the reading of the Weekly Torah portion by the Bar Mitzva boy in the synagogue on Saturday.

The holidays were celebrated according to Jewish law. Each child had their own menorah for Hanukkah, and costumes for Purim. On Simchat Torah, after the Kiddush, the children received so many goodies from the local congregants that there was barely enough room to store them in their personal wardrobes.

The orphanage organized celebrations for the children's birthdays, where each child received a gift and a cake was baked in their honor. Twice a year, the children received new clothes, and every year they went on a vacation to the countryside.

== Educational environment ==
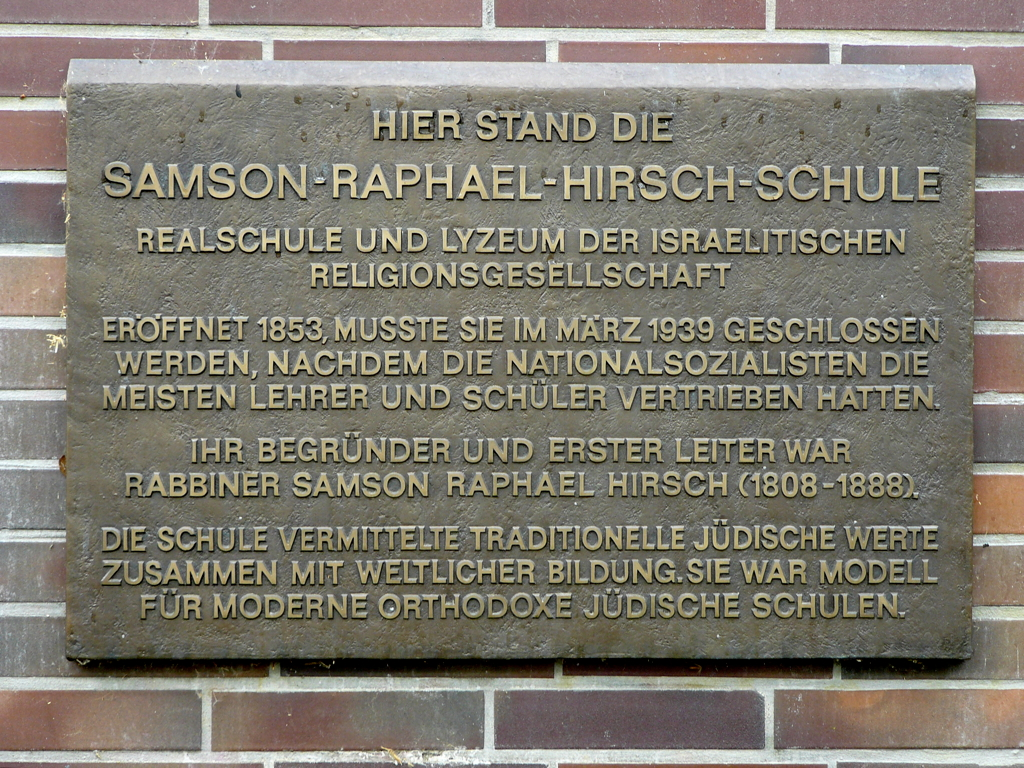
Commemorative plaque of the Samson Raphael Hirsch School, 2001, Frankfurt

The children of the orphanage attended the school established by Rabbi Samson Raphael Hirsch. This school emphasized traditional Jewish values alongside a general education, serving as a model for modern Orthodox Jewish schools. The school no longer exists, but a plaque was placed in its location stating that: The school opened in 1853 and was forced to close in March 1939, after most of the teachers were arrested by the Nazis or fled for their lives.

== Under Nazi rule ==
In 1935 many mothers from nearby villages and towns around Frankfurt, left without shelter or the ability to support their families, turned to the Jewish orphanage in Frankfurt, requesting to admit their children in the hope that they would receive protection, proper nutrition, and a good education. In addition to these children, others arrived from institutions that had been forcibly closed down. Isidor and Rosa Marx endeavored to admit as many children as possible and not turn them away. To accommodate them, beds were placed everywhere: in bedrooms, corridors, classrooms, and even in the dining room.

As part of the requirements under the Nuremberg Laws, the non-Jewish staff working at the orphanage had to be dismissed. They were replaced by girls who had taken refuge in the orphanage, and were trained for the work. This training was important and beneficial for the girls, preparing them for their immigration to Israel.

While the number of children seeking refuge in the orphanage increased, donations to the orphanage significantly decreased due to the emigration of Jews from Germany, economic difficulties faced by Jews, and the imposition of high taxes, especially on Jews. Jews leaving Germany were forbidden to take their money out of the country, so some contributed their funds to the orphanage. The tax exemption granted to the orphanage was also canceled in 1937.

As the children travelled from the orphanage to school, they encountered statues or posters depicting Jews in a grotesque and humiliating manner. Additionally, non-Jewish children along the way intimidated them, chased after them and beat them.

In October 1938, the Nazi authorities arrested Polish Jewish citizens residing in Germany to deport them to Poland, including the Jewish children from the orphanage who were of Polish origin. Isidor, the director, managed to take the children off the train to Poland and returned them to the orphanage. On Kristallnacht, November 9, 1938, police officers and SS personnel also entered the Jewish orphanage, expelled the children onto the street, and sowed destruction, fear, and panic in the place. The next day, on the morning after Kristallnacht, many mothers with their children knocked on its doors. The SS men explained to Isidor that they were not arresting him so that he would take in all the homeless children as thy Germans were still encouraging Jewish emigration from Germany. Isidor received assurances from the SS men that they would not interfere with his efforts to rescue the German children. From that moment, Isidor acted with even greater urgency, reaching out to various organizations and his contacts worldwide to take in the Jewish children as soon as possible, but many countries set immigration quotas and regulations that restricted the issue of entry permits. There was also a fear that with the arrival of so many refugees would raise anti-Semitism and countries feared that with the arrival of so many refugees, the economic crisis in their countries would deepen, leading to increased unemployment, as the children left Germany without anything.

Many parents who felt the imminent danger decided to part with their children and send them to a safe place outside Germany through the Kindertransport. The administrative center for the Kindertransport for all of southwest Germany was located in Frankfurt. Despite the conditions and restrictions imposed in many countries, England accepted most of the children. Others were sent to Holland, Belgium, Sweden, the United States, Switzerland, and France.

On November 22, 1938, a few days after Kristallnacht, 24 children left the orphanage for Holland. Those who remained behind envied those who went to Holland, as they were sure that those leaving would be saved, and those who stayed were still in danger. Later, it was revealed that even in Holland, the children were arrested by the Nazis and sent to the Westerbork transit camp, and from there to extermination camps. Out of the 24 children, only two boys and two girls survived. The girls who survived were Yuta and Tzili Levitus, who were hidden until the end of the war by Righteous Gentiles, who were later honored by Yad Vashem.

Alongside his tireless efforts to find refuge for the children, Isidor also accompanied groups of orphans to their new destinations, and later returned to his work at the orphanage. Martha Wertheimer, who also accompanied the children leaving Germany, described how challenging each journey was. The bureaucracy before departure was complex, and at times, the children faced hostile encounters with the Nazis who humiliated them and confiscated some of their meager belongings. On their journey to England, which involved crossing three borders, there were over a hundred children in each group. Each child had to be examined by a doctor and meet with an immigration officer. Only upon reaching the first station outside Germany, in Holland, did the children receive a warm welcome. Upon their arrival in England, the reception was warm, but shortly afterwards, the children were dispersed and sent to various destinations. Foster parents came to choose children from the group, thus separating siblings and friends. While some foster families provided a warm home for the children, others exploited them. In some homes, the children were unable to maintain a religious way of life and were forced to forgo kashrut observance. Additionally, there were groups of children housed in hostels. With the outbreak of war in September 1939, some of the older children were suspected of being spies for Germany and were consequently sent to an internment camp in Australia.

== Departure of groups of children to Israel ==
To prevent and uprising of the Arab population, the British allowed only small numbers of Jewish children to enter the Land of Israel. Even the absorption of these children encountered economic difficulties. Isidor knew that time was pressing, and there was no time to hesitate. He turned to James Armand de Rothschild, who was willing to fund the children's immigration, but there was no suitable institution in the country to receive them. While still at the orphanage, Isidor prepared the children for their immigration – showing them films and teaching them useful words in Hebrew.

=== Boys Aliyah in April 1939 ===
Thanks to the funding of James Armand de Rothschild, the intake of 35 boys from the orphanage was assured by the religious youth village in Kfar Hasidim near Haifa. The Rothschild family agreed to donate money for the construction of living quarters, classrooms, a dining room, and the purchase of furniture. But the youth village demanded that the orphanage send the children with clothing, bedding, towels, and more – supplies that the youth village did not have funding for and were difficult to obtain in the country at that time. Isidor, the orphanage director, explained that the orphanage had no additional resources to purchase everything required. Nevertheless, the children were sent well-equipped.

On the day of departure some of the parents came to say goodbye to their children. Isidor, who wanted to accompany the children this time as well, faced difficulties imposed by the British, fearing he might choose to stay in the country. He explained to them that he had to go back to Germany to take care of the remaining 150 children who were in the orphanage, even though it was a life-threatening for him to return. With the help of friends, public figures, and the Jewish Agency, he finally obtained a tourist visa in order to accompany the children on their trip.

During the journey there was still tension and concern about whether they would indeed manage to leave Germany. In Trieste, Italy, the children boarded the ship "Galilea." On April 25, 1939, the ship arrived on the shores of Haifa, and from there, the children were transported to their destination – the religious youth village. Isidor stayed in the country for about a month, saw that the children were settled in the youth village, and also met with the orphanage alumni who made aliya in previous years and were integrated into Israeli life. The absorption process at the village was relatively easy for the children, as many people there spoke German. The children were integrated into the school and also worked on the village farm as well. What weighed on their happiness was the concern for the fate of their parents. Initially, they still received letters or postcards from their parents via the Red Cross, but these stopped arriving. Only in 1945 did many of the children learn that their parents and families had perished.

=== Girls Aliyah in April 1940 ===
At the end of March 1940, a group of 16 girls left the orphanage on their way to the Land of Israel. In the port of Trieste, Italy, they boarded the ship "Marco Polo" and arrived in Haifa on April 4, 1940. From there, they went straight to Jerusalem. Three women worked for the absorption of the girls in Jerusalem: Henrietta Szold, who headed Youth Aliya at that time, Hannah Yehudit Landau – the principal of the Evelina de Rothschild School, who received the girls at the school, and Ella Schwartzstein. Schwartzstein was the director of the girls' section at the orphanage in Frankfurt and was a friend of Hannah Landau. The three women also housed the girls in a hostel near Mandelbaum Gate.

== Closure of the orphanage ==
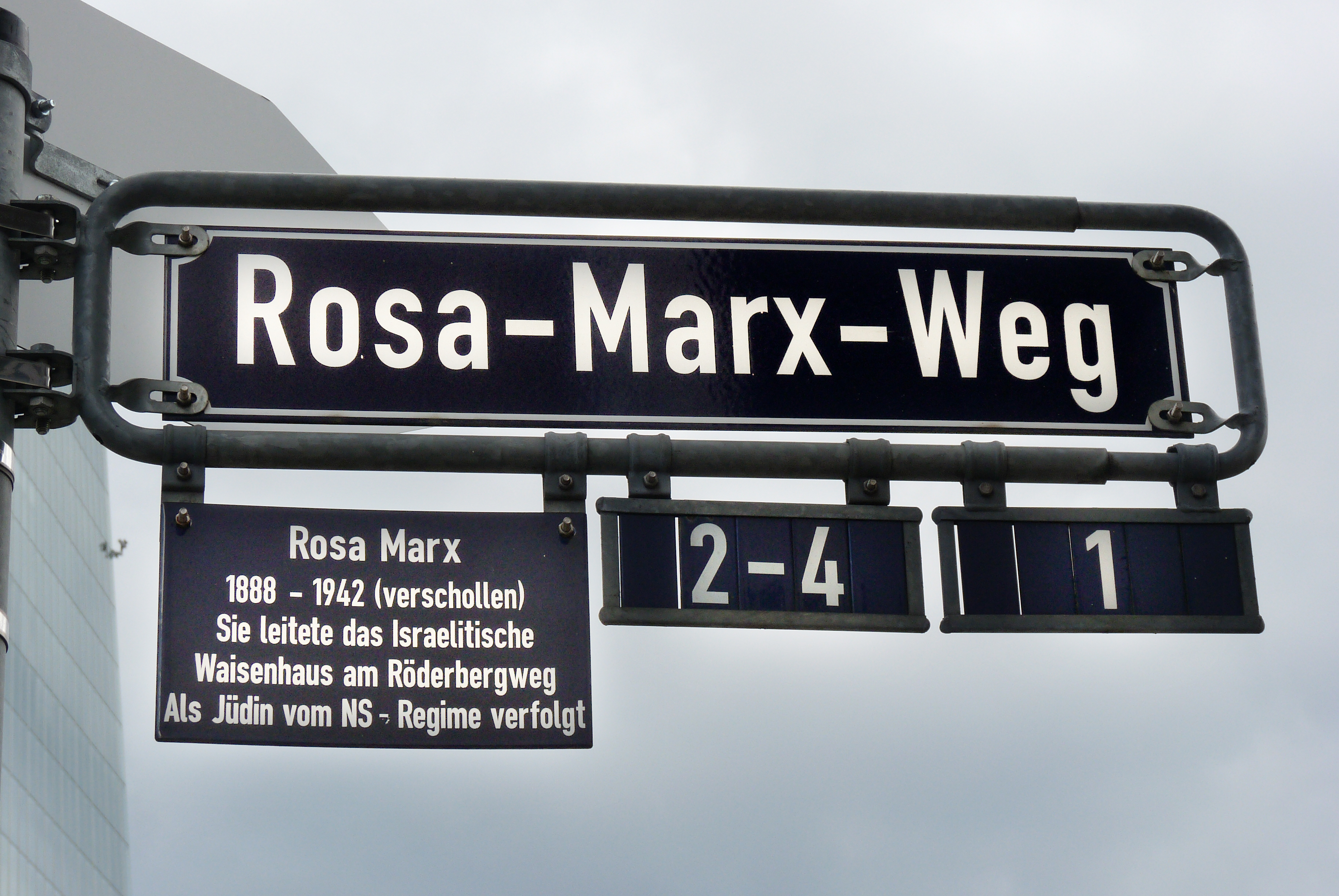
In memory of Rosa Marx, a street was named after her in Frankfurt.

After the war broke out, Rosa managed the orphanage on her own, but she was deported to the eastern Germany in the spring of 1942 where she perished.

The orphanage was closed by the Nazis in July 1942. Children from the orphanage were sent to the children's home of the Jewish Women's Welfare Association at 24 Hans Thoma Street in Frankfurt. In September 1942, the children's home on Hans Thoma Street was also closed. The remaining children and staff were sent to concentration camps.

With the outbreak of World War II, Isidor stayed in England with a group of children that he had accompanied there, as It was known that upon his return to Germany, he would be arrested and sent to a concentration camp. Therefore, he received approval from the English authorities to stay in England, and as a result he survived the war. In England, he established an educational institution for refugee children which closed In 1946, the institution closed. Isidor moved to the United States; he remarried Gitta Goldsmith. Isidor died in 1968 in New York City at the age of 83.

== Jewish Rescuers citation ==
In 2022, Rosa and Isidor Marx were recognized by the B'nai B’rith Organization as Jewish Rescuers. In a ceremony held at the religious youth village in Kfar Hasidim on June 6, 2023, the descendants of Rosa and Isidor Marx were awarded the B’nai B’rith World Center-Jerusalem and Keren Kayemeth LeIsrael (KKL-JNF) Jewish Rescuers Citation.

== See also ==
- History of the Jews in Germany
- History of the Jews during World War II
- The Holocaust in Germany
- Jewish Orphanage Berlin-Pankow
