= Puschel =

Puschel or Püschel is a surname. Notable people with the surname include:

- Dieter Puschel (1939–1992), German racing cyclist
- Karin Püschel (born 1958), German former volleyball player
- Konrad Püschel (1907–1997), German architect, town planner, academic and former Bauhaus student
- Ursula Püschel (1930–2018), German literary critic.
