= Hans-Peter Jannoch =

German conductor, pianist and composer

Hans-Peter Jannoch (1938–2004) was a German conductor, composer, and pianist.

== Life ==
Jannoch studied piano and composition at the Hochschule für Musik "Hanns Eisler". Afterwards he was a répétiteur at the Leipzig Opera and at the Deutsches Nationaltheater und Staatskapelle Weimar. He was a member of the "Kammerensemble Paul Dessau" (formerly: gruppe neue musik weimar). In 1983, he was awarded the Hanns Eisler Prize. In 1989, he co-founded the "ensemble unitedberlin", which also included his pieces. He taught music theory at the Hochschule für Musik "Hanns Eisler" in Berlin and is considered a sponsor of Helmut Zapf. His works have been published by Breitkopf & Härtel in Leipzig and were performed by the Staatskapelle Weimar, among others. In 2001, the composer Hermann Keller dedicated the piece "Klavierstücke für Lehrer, Kollegen und Freunde" to him.

== Work ==
- Appell für Vietnam (cantata)
- Divertimento für Streichorchester
- Aynn Wintrstück (chamber music)
- Freude, Freude heißt der Kreis (Choral music)
- Scherzo für Bläserquintett
- Pneuma für Orchester

== Radio play ==
- Totenmesse by Jörg Michael Koerbl. Dokumentation, MDR/WDR 1993.

== Publication ==
- Musikgeschichte, quo vadis?. In Musik und Gesellschaft 1980, issue 11,
