= Peter Dorn =

German composer and pianist (born 1931)

Peter Dorn (born November 1931) is a German composer and classical pianist.

== Life ==
Dorn was born in Wroclaw, capital of Silesia. He attended the Thomasschule zu Leipzig. He studied piano with Gerhard Puchelt and Amadeus Webersinke at the Berlin University of the Arts and the University of Music and Theatre Leipzig. Until 1959, he worked as a pianist in West Germany. Cologne 1968, p. 125. He studied composition with Wilhelm Weismann in Leipzig and as a Meisterschüler with Rudolf Wagner-Régeny at the Academy of Arts, Berlin (in East Berlin). He then worked at the Berlin Academy of Arts.

Dorn's violin sonatas are published by C. F. Peters Musikverlag in Leipzig. In 1968, he was awarded the Hanns Eisler Prize in Leipzig for his cantata In deiner Hand steht geschrieben die Zeit. The premiere was given by the MDR Leipzig Radio Symphony Orchestra and the Rundfunkchor Leipzig under the direction of Herbert Kegel. The music prize was awarded for the first time that year, together with the composers Ruth Zechlin and Gerhard Rosenfeld.

His Klaviermusik 1964 was once compared with Mussorgsky's composition Pictures at an Exhibition.

== Work ==
- Sonatine für Violine und Klavier.
- Sonate für Viola und Klavier
- Klaviermusik in 4 Suiten
- Rhapsodie für Violine und Klavier.
- In deiner Hand steht geschrieben die Zeit
- Divertimento.
