= Peter Wicke =

German musicologist

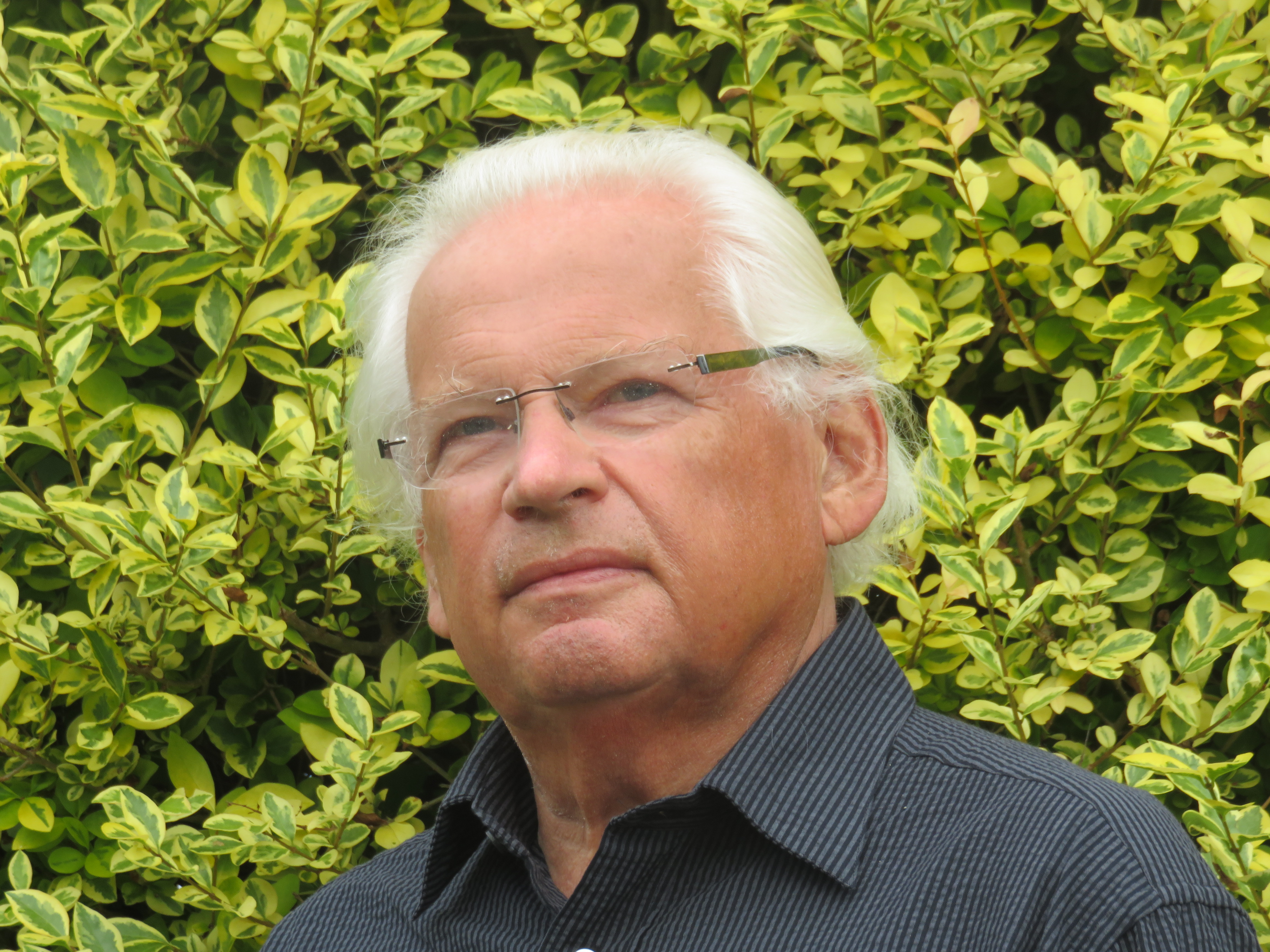
Peter Wicke 2018

Peter Wicke (born 1951 in Zwickau) is a German musicologist, who is particularly interested in popular music; he teaches as a university professor at Humboldt-Universität zu Berlin.

== Life and achievements ==
Born in Zwickau, Wicke studied musicology in Berlin until 1974 and received his PhD in 1980 with a dissertation on the music aesthetics of popular music. In 1986, he was awarded a doctorate (Dr. sc. phil.) with a thesis on the aesthetics and sociology of rock music and in 1988 he was appointed Adjunct Research Professor at the Department of Music of Carleton University in Ottawa. In 1992 he was appointed to the Humboldt University Berlin, where he held the chair for "Theory and History of Popular Music" until his retirement in 2016. He was also director of the "Research Center for Popular Music" at the Department of Musicology of the Humboldt University.

Wicke is a member of the International Association for the Study of Popular Music and was its General Secretary in 1987 and 1991. From 1986 to 1992 he was European Director of the "International Communication and Youth Culture Consortium" of UNESCO and from 1993 to 1997 he was a member of the Presidium of the Cultural Political Society of the Federal Republic of Germany. Since 1998 Wicke has been a member of the Deutscher Musikrat.

Wicke has published several international articles on theoretical, historical and cultural policy. problems of popular music appeared, which were translated into over fifteen languages. In 1972 he was the winner of the Hanns Eisler Prize of the GDR.

== Publications ==
- Popmusik, Studie der gesellschaftlichen Funktion einer Musikpraxis; ein Beitrag zur Ästhetik musikalischer Massenkultur. Berlin, Humboldt-Universität, Gesellschaftswissenschaftliche Fakultät, Diss. A, 1980
- Wegzeichen. Studien zur Musikwissenschaft. (with Jürgen Mainka) (Verlag Neue Musik Berlin 1983).
- Rock-Pop-Jazz-Folk. Handbuch der Populären Musik. (with W. Ziegenrücker) (Deutscher Verlag für Musik Leipzig 1985).
- Rockmusik. Zur Ästhetik und Soziologie eines Massenmediums. Reclam, Leipzig 1986, ISBN 3-379-00141-4.
- Anatomie des Rock. Deutscher Verlag für Musik, Leipzig 1987, ISBN 3-370-00071-7.
- Rock Music: Culture-Aesthetic-Sociology (Cambridge University Press, Cambridge 1990).
- Bigger Than Life: Musik und Musikindustrie in den USA. Reclam, Leipzig 1992, ISBN 3-379-00723-4.
- Vom Umgang with Popmusik. Volk und Wissen, Berlin 1993, ISBN 3-06-102899-4.
- Rockmusik und Politik. (with Lothar Müller), Ch. Links Verlag, Berlin 1996, ISBN 3-86153-096-1.
- Handbuch der populären Musik: Pop Rock Jazz Folk Weltmusik. (with W. Ziegenrücker), Schott, Mainz 1997.
- Music and Cultural Theory. (with J. Shepherd) (Polity Press, Cambridge 1997).
- Von Mozart zu Madonna. Kiepenheuer, Leipzig 1998/Suhrkamp Frankfurt 2001, ISBN 3-518-39793-1.
- Handbuch der Musik im 20. Jahrhundert Bd. 8: Rock und Popmusik. (Laaber 2001).
- Musik Basiswissen (Duden/Paetec Berlin 2005) und Lehrbuch Gymnasiale Oberstufe (Duden/Paetec Frankfurt, Berlin 2006).
- Handbuch der populären Musik: Geschichte, Stile, Praxis, Industrie. (with W. + K.-E. Ziegenrücker), Schott, Mainz 2007, ISBN 978-3-7957-0571-8.
- Rock und Pop. Von Elvis Presley bis Lady Gaga. C. H. Beck, Munich 2011, ISBN 978-3-406-62131-4.
