= Helmut Zapf =

German composer

Helmut Zapf (born 4 March 1956) is a German composer.

== Life ==
Born in Rauschengesees, Thüringen, Zapf studied church music from 1974 until 1979 at the Kirchenmusikschulen Eisenach (Thüringen) and the Evangelische Hochschule für Kirchenmusik Halle. During this time Zapf took part in the Summer Courses for Neue Musik in Gera (Thuringia).

After graduating, he worked as Kantor at the city church in Eisenberg (Thuringia) from 1979 to 1982. Until the beginning of his Meisterschülerstudium with Georg Katzer at the Akademie der Künste der DDR in Berlin (1982–1986), he wrote his first self-taught compositions, among others Singender Mann for solo flute, Brechungen I und II for flute and string trio, Klangetüde II for orchestra, Recitativ for oboe and string quartet.

Since completing his masterclass, Zapf has lived and worked as self employed composer in Zepernick (Panketal) near Berlin.

He has been a member of the Academy of Arts, Berlin since 2015.

== Work ==
Orchestral

- 1985/86: Wechselnd
- 1986: Concertino
- 1988: Venezianische Erinnerungen
- 1989: Piece
- 1992: Dreiklang III
- 1992: Dreiklang V
- 2008: Und wenn die Welt voll Teufel wär
- 2009: Aufwind
- 2010: Lasst uns Hütten bauen
- 2015: Klangbäume
- 2016: Eomeonie (Mutter/mother)
- 2017: im Wind ertrunken (großer Epilog zu "windwärts")
- 2017: windwärts

Chamber music

- 2003: Trionfale II for trumpet in C, horn in F, trombone, tuba and 2 accordions
- 2003: Albedo IX for baglama, flute, clarinet, horn and piano
- 2004: Empty and silent for soprano, violin and guitar
- 2004: When winter comes for violin and guitar
- 2004: Odem for C-flute (Picc. Bssfl.), oboe (Engl. horn), clarinet in B (Bsskl.), tuba
- 2004: Odem II for accordion and piano
- 2005: Ein Mund voll Wind for mezzo-soprano, alto recorder, vibraphone (and timpani) and piano text after Wolfgang Hilbig, Geste
- 2005: Klangetüde III for violin, 4 baglamas and piano
- 2005: Rechenschaft for alto and oboe, text Wolfgang Hilbig
- 2006: Rechenschaft version for soprano and soprano saxophone
- 2006: Fragmente for clarinet in B and string trio
- 2007: Sand for chamber ensemble (fl.cl.sax.vl.va.vc.pn)
- 2008: Rechenschaft version for soprano and violoncello

Chamber music with electronics

- 2006: Skeleton for clarinet in B-flat, accordion, double bass and live electronics.
- 2006: Brecht ab den Sang der Maschinen. Brecht auf! for chamber ensemble (fl.ob.piano.hr.vl.vc.cb.pn.perc.soprano) and CD-playback
- 2006: Das goldene Kalb for chamber ensemble (fl.ob.kl.tp.trb.vl.va.2vc.kb.2perc.pn.soprano) and CD-performance

Percussion music

- 2006: Starres Gold – Weiße Stille for percussion quartet
- 2006: Randspiel for percussion solo and CD-player

Organ music

- 2004: Ombre per Organo II (... so sind unsere Fröhlichkeiten ...) for organ and CD-playback
- 2004: Klangbeschreibungen II for organ solo

Choral music

- 2004: Die sorgenvollen Gesichter 4–8 voices, mixed choir and solos (S.A.T.B.), text: W.Hilbig
- 2007: Migration 4–8 voices mixed choir, alto saxophone and electronics, text: Old Testament

Music for stage

- 2006: Das Goldene Kalb, ballet for chamber ensemble (fl.ob.kl.trp.tb.akk.hf.pn.perc.perc.vl.va.vc.vc.cb.), Sopr. & Electronics – Libretto Dr. Ulrike Liedtke – premiere
- 2007: Neues Schlosstheater der Musikakademie Rheinsberg – ensemble mosaik berlin – direction: Arno Waschk

Radio play music

- 1988: Katja Oelmann: Steig der Stadt aufs Dach – Direction: Barbara Plensat (Hörspiel – Rundfunk der DDR)

== Awards ==
- 1986: Hanns Eisler Prize by Radio DDR II
- 1989: Hans Stieber Prize
- 1990: Prize of critics of the Music Criticism Commission of the Verband der Komponisten und Musikwissenschaftler der DDR for the GDR Music Days (for organum for percussion, harp and organ)
- 1990: Diplom of the Kranichsteiner Musikpreis
- 1993: Promotion prize of the Academy of Arts, Berlin and Brandenburg
- 1995: Guest of Honour of the Villa Massimo Rome
- 1999: Scholarship holder of the Konrad Adenauer Foundation
- 2000: Work scholarship of the State of Lower Saxony at the Künstlerhof Schreyahn
- 2005: Working scholarship of the Akademie der Künste Berlin at the Villa Serpentara near Rome
