= Sülzetal =

- Municipality
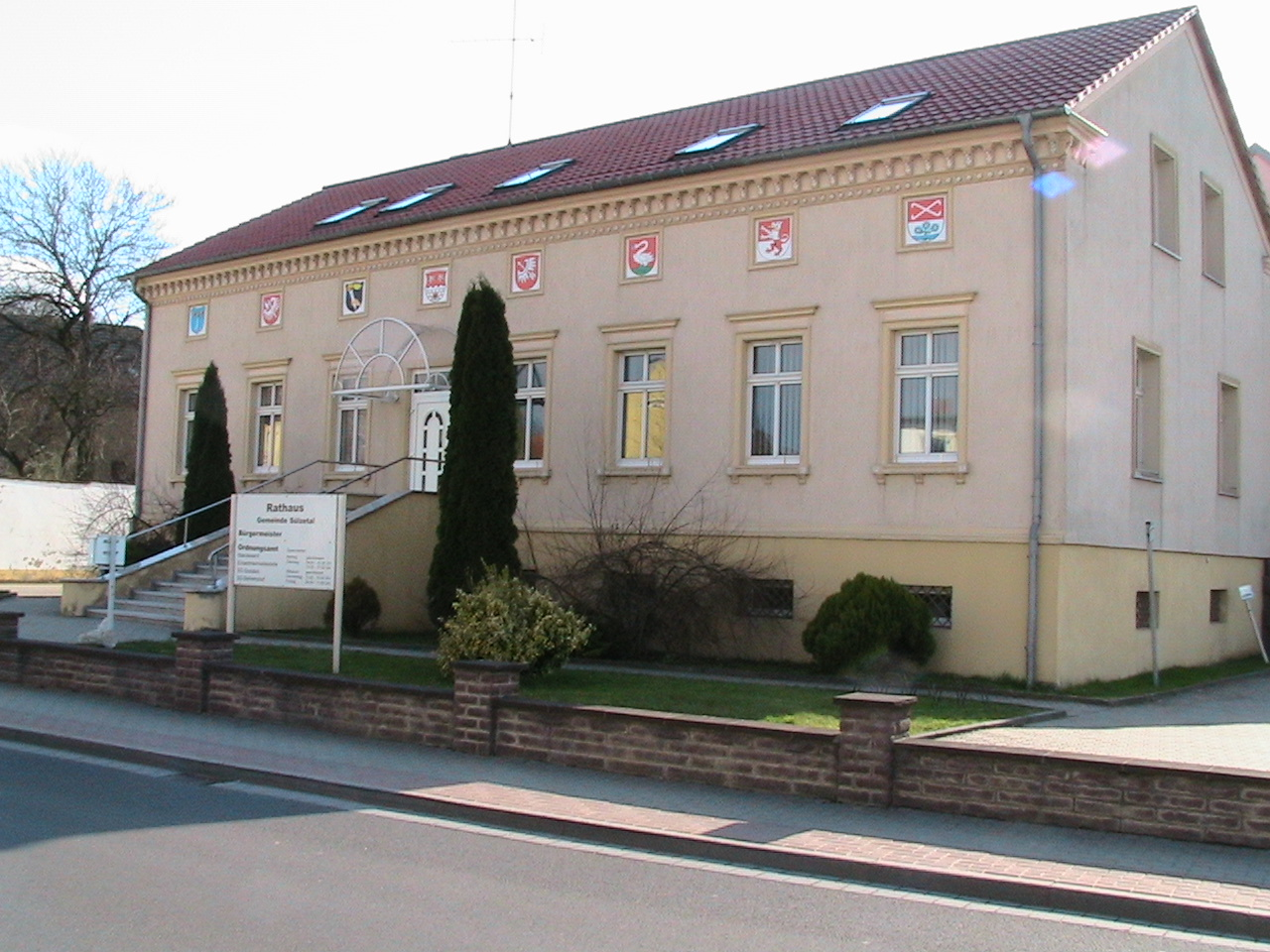
- Town hall at Osterweddingen

- Coat of arms

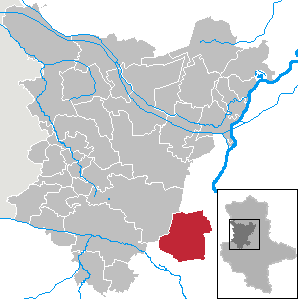
- Location of Sülzetal within Börde district
- Interactive map of Sülzetal
- Location within Germany Location within Saxony-Anhalt
- Coordinates: 52°0′0″N 11°31′47″E
- Country: Germany
- State: Saxony-Anhalt
- District: Börde
- Subdivisions: 8

Government
  - Mayor (2020–27): Jörg-Uwe Methner

Area
  - Total: 103.64 km^{2} (40.02 sq mi)
- Elevation: 83 m (272 ft)

Population (2025-12-31)
  - Total: 8,566
  - Density: 82.65/km^{2} (214.1/sq mi)
- Time zone: UTC+01:00 (CET)
  - Summer (DST): UTC+02:00 (CEST)
- Postal codes: 39171
- Dialling codes: 039205 (Dodendorf 0391)
- Vehicle registration: BK
- Website: www.gemeinde-suelzetal.de

Sülzetal is a municipality in the Börde district in Saxony-Anhalt, Germany. It is situated on the creek Sülze, a tributary of the Elbe, about 10 km (6.2 mi) southwest of Magdeburg. Sülzetal was established on 1 April 2001 by the merger of the former municipalities Altenweddingen, Bahrendorf, Dodendorf, Langenweddingen, Osterweddingen, Schwaneberg, Stemmern and Sülldorf. The Sülze valley is characterized by artesian aquifers, delivering brine (sulza) that had been used for salt production.

== History ==
The first documentation of a settlement in the area dates back to 937 with the mention of Osterweddingen and Sülldorf. The village of Langenweddingen and Dodendorf were mentioned in 946 and 978 respectively as a possession of Saint Maurice's Abbey at Magdeburg. On 5 May 1809 the churchyard of Saint Christopherus at Dodendorf was the site of an attack by Prussian freikorps troops under Ferdinand von Schill and Ludwig Adolf Wilhelm von Lützow against the army of Napoleonic Westphalia. Lützow was severely wounded and had to face a court-martial for his arbitrary act.

Under Nazi Germany, Bahrendorf was the location of a forced labour subcamp of the prison in Magdeburg.

On 6 July 1967 the level crossing at Langenweddingen was the scene of one of the worst train accidents in Germany, when a bilevel train hit a tanker truck, resulting in an explosion that killed 94 people, many of them children on their way to a summer camp in the Harz mountains.

== Transport and economy ==
The villages of Dodendorf, Osterweddingen and Langenweddingen have access to the railway line from Magdeburg to Thale, served by the Veolia Verkehr company since 2005.

The letter processing center for the greater Magdeburg area is located in Sülzetal.

== Administration ==
Seats in the municipal assembly (Gemeinderat) as of 2004 elections:

- Social Democratic Party of Germany: 8
- Christian Democratic Union: 6
- Association of Independent Voters: 2
- Free Democratic Party: 1
- Culture and Sports Club Osterweddingen: 1
- Free Voters Schwaneberg: 1
- The Left: 1

== Notable people ==
- Friedrich Aue, resistance fighter, born 27 July 1896 in Dodendorf, died 27 November 1944 in Brandenburg an der Havel
- Heinz Weitzendorf (born 1931), composer and conductor
