= Hans Tutschku =

German composer

Hans Tutschku at his Exhibition, Galery ACC in Weimar, October 2026

Hans Tutschku (born January 30 in 1966) is a German composer and Professor at Harvard University.

Tutschku was born in Weimar, East Germany. He has been a member of the Ensemble for Intuitive Music Weimar since 1982. He studied composition of electronic music at the Hochschule für Musik Carl Maria von Weber, Dresden, and since 1989 has participated in several concert cycles of Karlheinz Stockhausen to study the art of the sound direction. He further studied sonology and electroacoustic composition in 1991–92 at the Royal Conservatory of The Hague, the Netherlands.

In 1994 there followed a one-year study residency at IRCAM in Paris. He taught during 1995–1996 as a guest professor of electroacoustic composition in Weimar. In 1996, he participated in composition workshops with Klaus Huber and Brian Ferneyhough. From 1997 until 2001 he taught electroacoustic composition at IRCAM in Paris and from 2001 to 2004 taught at the Conservatory of Montbéliard. In May 2003 he completed a doctorate (Ph.D.) with Jonty Harrison at the University of Birmingham. During the spring term of 2003 he was the Edgar Varèse Guest Professor at Technische Universität Berlin.

Since September 2004, Tutschku has held the position of Professor of Music at Harvard University and Director of Harvard's Studio for Electroacoustic Composition. During the last few years he has been invited to give master classes in São Paulo, Buenos Aires, Santiago de Chile, Singapore, Budapest, Darmstadt, Florence, Milano and Rome. He is the winner of many international composition competitions including: Bourges, CIMESP São Paulo, Hanns Eisler Prize, Prix Ars Electronica, Prix Noroit, Prix Musica Nova, ZKM Giga-Hertz, CIME ICEM and Klang!. In 2005 he received the Weimar Prize. In 2013 he held a fellowship at the Radcliffe Institute for Advanced Study, and in 2014 a stipend from the Japan–U.S. Friendship Commission.

== List of works ==
- 1987 – Durchdringung, 2-channel electroacoustic composition, 6:40 min
- 1987 – Hommage à Laszlo Moholy-Nagy, 2-channel electroacoustic composition, 10:51 min
- 1989 – Sein wirkliches Herz, 2-channel electroacoustic composition, 9:10 min
- 1989 – Übergänge, 2-channel electroacoustic composition, 8:50 min
- 1991 – Die zerschlagene Stimme, 4-channel electroacoustic composition, 10:14 min CD
- 1991 – Drei Traumgesichter, for English horn and electronics, 11:30 min
- 1992 – The Metal Voice, for percussion and tape, 11:30 min
- 1994 – Nachts, for violoncello, bass clarinet, percussion and electronics, 15:00 min
- 1995 – Freibrief für einen Traum, for soprano, flute, cello, percussion and electronics, 12:30 min
- 1995 – Sieben Stufen, 4-channel electroacoustic composition, 13:00 min CD
- 1996 – ...erinnerung..., 4-channel electroacoustic composition, 10:10 min CD
- 1996 – Der unsichtbare Hörturm, open air sound installation
- 1996 – Flammenklang Meiningen, 16 hot air balloon engines, dancers, choir, ensemble and electronics, 60:00 min
- 1996 – les invisibles, 8-channel electroacoustic composition, 12:30 min CD
- 1996 – rapprochement-éloignement, for mezzo-soprano, flute, viola and harp, 10:30 min
- 1997 – Verdichtung, for two choirs and electronics, 13:00 min
- 1998 – Départs, for soprano, percussion, 10 instruments and electronics, 17:30 min
- 1998 – extrémités lointaines, 8-channel electroacoustic composition, 16:24 min CD
- 1998 – Lissabon Project, music for the ballet "Lissabon-Projekt"
- 1998 – The breath, the air, the light, (Der Atem, die Luft, das Licht) film music for Marco Gastini
- 1999 – Das bleierne Klavier, for piano and live-electronics, 12:00 min CD
- 1999 – Die Kirche als Klangskulptur, 16-channel sound installation
- 1999 – Eikasia, 8-channel electroacoustic composition, 12:15 min CD
- 1999 – human–space–factory, 8-channel electroacoustic composition, 11:49 min CD
- 1999 – NochDreiSekundenSchwarz, video in collaboration with Kerstin Wagener, ZKM Karlsruhe
- 2000 – Epexergasia – Neun Bilder, 4-channel electroacoustic composition, 12:03 min CD
- 2000 – résorption-coupure, 4-channel electroacoustic composition, 14:27 min
- 2000 – SprachSchlag, for percussion and live-electronics, 14:00 min
- 2001 – memory-fragmentation, 8-channel electroacoustic composition, 11:44 min
- 2001 – Migration pétrée, 8-channel electroacoustic composition, 13:35 min CD
- 2002 – Cito, for French horn, piano and live-electronics
- 2002 – La joie ivre, 2-channel electroacoustic composition, 10:24 min CD
- 2002 – Trois structures, for Baschet Resonators and live-electronics
- 2002 – Vibrations décomposées, 4-channel electroacoustic composition, 5:30 min
- 2004 – Cinq espaces du crépuscule, for organ and live-electronics, 20:00 min
- 2004 – object – obstacle, 8-channel electroacoustic composition, 12:29 min CD
- 2004 – Rituale, 32-channel electroacoustic composition for wave field synthesis (WFS), 15:06 min
- 2004 – Rojo, 8-channel electroacoustic composition, 15.06 min CD
- 2004 – Similis, 8-channel electroacoustic composition, 13:55 min
- 2005 – Die Süsse unserer traurigen Kindheit, Music theater, 80:00 min
- 2006 – Salut du Mexique, 2-channel electroacoustic composition, 2:37 min
- 2006 – Winternacht, for piano, percussion and live-electronics, 13:00 min CD
- 2007 – Dialog für zwei Instrumentalgruppen
- 2007 – Distance liquide, 8-channel electroacoustic composition, 13:00 min CD
- 2007 – Einst mit dir, for soprano, clarinet, violin and live-electronics, 13:00 min
- 2007 – pour B., 2-channel electroacoustic composition, 5:00 min
- 2007 – Shore, for oboe and live-electronics, 11:20 min
- 2007 – Tell Me! ... a secret ..., interactive sound and video installation
- 2007 – Zellen-Linien, for piano and live-electronics, 19:00 min
- 2008 – Monochord, 2-channel electroacoustic composition, 12:14 min
- 2008 – Zwei Räume, 24-channel electroacoustic composition, 21:00 min CD
- 2009 – Ailleurs – Intérieur, sound installation in three parts
- 2009 – fragile connections, for violin, French horn and piano
- 2009 – Klangwald – Lichtgestein, open-air multimedia composition with sound and light projection
- 2009 – Polyvision, for dance, video and ensemble, 40:00 min
- 2009 – Terra Infirma, music for a choreography by Larissa Douglas Koch
- 2010 – agitated slowness, 24-channel electroacoustic composition, 33.00 min
- 2010 – Firmament – schlaflos, 16-channel electroacoustic composition, 20.25 min CD
- 2010 – Irrgärten, for two pianos and live-electronics, 24:00 min
- 2011 – behind the light, for string quartet and electronics, 15:00 min
- 2011 – Klaviersammlung, 16-channel electroacoustic composition, 9:58 min CD
- 2012 – clin d’oreille d’Avignon, 8-channel electroacoustic composition, 10:00 min
- 2012 – entwurzelt, for six singers and electronics, 16:00 min
- 2012 – hommage à Schwitters, interactive sound sculpture
- 2012 – one minute for John Cage, for ensemble (as part of the Party Pieces Project), 1:00 min
- 2012 – unreal memories, outdoor sound installation for the Carpenter Center for the Visual Arts
- 2013 – Still Air 1, for bass clarinet and electronics, 11:30 min
- 2013 – under, for flute, oboe, clarinet, two violins, viola, violoncello, percussion, piano and electronics, 14:40 min
- 2014 – collaboration, interactive sound sculpture
- 2014 – Interlaced 1, for bass clarinet and electronics, 10:15 min
- 2014 – Issho ni, 16-channel electroacoustic composition, 31:00 min CD
- 2014 – Still Air 2, for oboe and electronics, 11:30 min
- 2014 – Still Air 3, for oboe, bass clarinet and electronics, 11:30 min
- 2014 – The other side, interactive sound sculptures and photo installation
- 2015 – encounter, improvisation with Vijay Iyer (piano) and Hans Tutschku (live-electronics), 29:00 min
- 2015 – pressure – divided, for violoncello and 8-channel live-electronics, 18:00 min
- 2015 – resonating lines, for violin, violoncello, piano, percussion and electronics, 15:00 min
- 2015 – Shadow of bells, for piano and electronics, 23:00 min
- 2016 – codification – memory, for soprano, percussion, nine instruments and live-electronics, 22:00 min
- 2016 – periods of existence, for ten instruments, 17:30 min
- 2016 – Pneuma(tic) Bodies, improvisation with Jill Johnson (dance) and Hans Tutschku (live-electronics)
- 2016 – Remembering Japan – part 1, 16 channel electroacoustic composition, 9:48 min CD
- 2016 – voice – unrooted, for soprano and electronics, 16:00 min
- 2017 – nighttime songs from afar, sound and light installation, 40:00 min
- 2017 – virtual bodies, for piano and live-electronics, 13:30 min
- 2018 – dark matter – avalanche, 24-channel electroacoustic composition, 14:45 min
- 2018 – Linien Texturen, graphic score for 4 players + 8channel fixed media sounds, 16:00 min
- 2018 – moments before the eruption, for seven instruments and electronics, 18:30 min
- 2018 – percussion forest, for 16 computerized percussion mallets and 24 loudspeakers, 25:00 min
- 2019 – Spannungsresonanzen, radio play, 8:30 min

== Discography ==
- 9 Trajectoires, a CD box by Ina GRM 2018
- Auf Abwegen, DegeM-CD15 2017
- Firmament, empreintes DIGITALes 2015
- Computer Music Journal Sound Anthology
- 30 Jahre Inventionen
- ICMC 2009
- CIMESP, 14th international Electroacoustic Music Contest of Sao Paulo
- Musik in Deutschland 1950–2000, Deutscher Musikrat
- Migration, Arizona University Recordings LLC, AUR CD 3134 2007
- Für kommende Zeiten, Ensemble für Intuitive Musik Weimar plays Karlheinz Stockhausen
- DVD – 50 Jahre TU Studio Berlin
- Klangreise, Ensemble für Intuitive Musik Weimar (EFIM) 2004
- Computer Music Journal, volume 27, 2003
- 15.+16. Tage Dresdner Tage Zeitgenössischer Musik
- Compendium International, IMEB Bourges 2000
- Presence II, Productions électro Productions (PeP) 2000
- MOMENT, empreintes DIGITALes 2000
- eXcitations, empreintes DIGITALes 2000
- Prix Ars Electronica Linz, 1998
- Ausbruch Aufbruch, DegeM CD04 1998
- Prix International Noroit – Léonce Petitot, 1998
- electroNIquE, CD for the opening of the electronic studios at the University Singapore
- CIMESP São Paulo, 1995
- Ausbruch der Klänge, Ensemble für Intuitive Musik Weimar in Mexico City 1994
- Stimmen...Klänge, DegeM CD01 1994
