= Heinz Weitzendorf =

German composer and conductor

Heinz Weitzendorf (born 4 May 1931) is a German composer and conductor.

== Life ==
Born in Altenweddingen, Weitzendorf first went to the preliminary studies department Arbeiter-und-Bauern-Fakultät in Halle. He then studied choral conducting at the Hochschule für Musik "Hanns Eisler". From 1957 to 1962, he was a conductor with the Ernst Hermann Meyer Ensemble of the Humboldt University of Berlin, the State Folk Art Ensemble of the German Democratic Republic and the ensemble of the Ministeriums des Inneren. He also studied composition with Wolfgang Hohensee in Berlin. From 1963, he was secretary of the Berlin district association of the Association of Composers and Musicologists of the GDR. He composed mainly wind and vocal music. His works appear by Verlag Neue Musik.

== Awards ==
- 1977: Patriotic Order of Merit in Bronze.
- 1981: Hanns Eisler Prize
- 1981: Kunstpreis of the National People's Army
- 1984: Vaterländischer Verdienstorden

== Work ==
- Ja, Häuser baun. Zum Fundamente legen (1965)
- Die Ballade vom Soldaten John (1966)
- Die Welt muß sich drehn (1968)
- Bei den Funkern (1972)
- Sinfonischer Revolutionsmarsch
