= Gerhard Rosenfeld =

German composer

Gerhard Rosenfeld (10 February 1931 – 5 March 2003) was a German composer. He became known for his film music and opera works, among other things.

== Life ==
Born in Königsberg, Rosenfeld studied musicology from 1952 to 1954 at the Humboldt-Universität zu Berlin as well as music theory and musical composition at the Hochschule für Musik "Hanns Eisler" Berlin from 1954 to 57 with Rudolf Wagner-Régeny. From 1958 to 1961 he was master student of Hanns Eisler and Leo Spies at the Akademie der Künste der DDR, from 1961 to 1964 lecturer at the International Music Library Berlin and lecturer for music theory at the Deutsche Hochschule für Musik Berlin and for film music at the Konrad Wolf Film University of Babelsberg.

After successes with classical music (Violin Concerto, 1963), Rosenfeld became one of the most prominent and busiest film composers of the DEFA in the 1960s. From 1964 he worked as a freelance composer and lived in Bergholz-Rehbrücke. He wrote the music for cinema, documentary, short films, children's and animated films. Among them are classics like The Rabbit Is Me (1965), Alfons Zitterbacke (1966) and The Banner of Krivoi Rog (1968). One project that he supervised from 1966 until his death, even after the German reunification, was the long-term documentation The Children of Golzow.

Rosenfeld composed six operas, among them The Everyday Miracle (after Evgeny Schwartz, premiere 1973 in Stralsund), The Mantle (after Gogol), first performance 1978 in Weimar), Die Verweigerung (after Gogol, first performance 1989 in Osnabrück) as well as Kniefall von Warschau about Willy Brandt (libretto by Philipp Kochheim, premiere 1997 in Dortmund). Dem Andenken und zur Ehre aller verfolgten Zigeuner, Requiem for Kaza Katharinnna, (To the memory and honour of all persecuted gypsies) was premiered in 1991 in the Church of Peace of Potsdam-Sanssouci and released on CD in 1996.

In October 1986 he was elected as successor of Wilhelm Neef as chairman of the Potsdam district association of the Verband der Komponisten und Musikwissenschaftler der DDR.

Rosenfeld has received several awards for his achievements. In 1968 he received the Hanns Eisler Prize, in 1973 the Art Prize of the German Democratic Republic and in 1980 the National Prize III. class.

Rosenberg died in Bergholz-Rehbrücke near Potsdam at the age of 72.

== Compositions ==
Other

- Orchestral pieces.
- Works for solo instruments with orchestra (including violin)
- Stage music (opera, ballet, acting)
- Chamber music
- Vocal work
- Pieces for mandolin orchestra
