= Ensemble for Intuitive Music Weimar =

The Ensemble for Intuitive Music Weimar or Ensemble für Intuitive Musik Weimar (EFIM) is a German music ensemble, which was founded by in 1980 during the period of the German Democratic Republic, originally performing music officially tabooed by the communist government.

EFIM uses orchestral instruments (trumpet/flügelhorn, violoncello, and piano/organ) and live-electronics. The computer-as-mobile-studio is played as a musical instrument; one which can, through the use of multichannel sound diffusion systems, control the movement of sounds in space.

== Origins ==
The formative inspiration for the ensemble was composer Karlheinz Stockhausen's method of composition that he called intuitive music. During the time of the German Democratic Republic (East Germany), the ensemble performed officially tabooed and "useless" areas of musical expression. The group's activities began in an unlawful gallery in Erfurt, continued in numerous churches, and even in the Palace of the Republic in Berlin. Beginning in 1987 a series of synesthetic projects based on Bauhaus traditions were realized. Prior to the political change in 1989 EFIM had given several hundred concerts; since then the ensemble has performed in more than twenty-five countries in America, Europe and Asia.

== Post-communist performances ==
In 1990, after the border opening, the ensemble gave its first concert in the presence of Stockhausen. He wrote afterwards in a letter:

...it was good that I finally heard you in a concert. I would like to thank you all: you kept the intuitive music alive. We will surely go on together to develop this unfamiliar music form.

In 2005 the collaboration with Stockhausen resulted in studio recordings of six intuitive compositions from his cycle Für kommende Zeiten under his direction for his CD label.

Since the early 1990s EFIM has worked on projects in collaboration with artists of other disciplines. One of the ensemble's most ambitious creations was "Flame Sound Meiningen" (1996) for 16 hot-air balloon burners, dancers, choir, ensemble, and tape by Hans Tutschku. This performance, which featured various configurations of 18-feet-high flames, took place in the English Garden of the city of Meiningen.

Also in 1996, EFIM collaborated with the choreographer Joachim Schloemer for the festival Kunstfest Weimar. "Imaginary Areas" was created for 4 dancers, ensemble and multi-dimensional sound projection, controlled by touch-sensitive dance floor sensors. In 1998 the ensemble worked with DJ Juryman (London) in the project "Disco as Art Space." In 1999, when Weimar was proclaimed a European Culture City, the EFIM traveled with the project "The Church as Sound Sculpture" (concerts and sound installations by Hans Tutschku) to Paris, Basel and Plovdiv. In collaboration with Christine Kono (Japan/USA), Dimitri Kraniotis (Greece/France), and David Kern (USA/Germany), the ensemble's 2003 project "Sacred Dances" was the centerpiece of the Culture Arena Jena in the Friedens Church.

The group has also taken part in Expo 2000 in Hanover, in the festivals in Porto (2001), Warsaw (2002), Rome (2003), Vienna (2004), Boston and New York City (2006).

== Ensemble members ==
- Daniel Hoffmann - trumpet / Flügelhorn
- Matthias von Hintzenstern - violoncello / overtone singing
- Hans Tutschku - live-Electronics
- Michael von Hintzenstern - piano / organ / harmonium
