= Thomas Ehricht =

German composer, music educator and dramaturge

- Born: 25 July 1940; Halle (Saale), Germany
- Died: 4 November 2025 (aged 85); Stralsund, Mecklenburg-Western Pomerania, Germany
- Education: Hochschule für Musik Franz Liszt, Weimar
- Occupations: Composer, music educator, dramaturge
- Organization: Mecklenburg-Vorpommern regional association of the Deutscher Komponistenverband (1992–2002, deputy chairman)
- Notable work: Kassandra (opera)
- Awards: Hanns Eisler Prize (1981)

Thomas Ehricht (25 July 1940 – 4 November 2025) was a German composer, music educator and dramaturge.

== Life ==
Born in Halle (Saale), Ehricht studied school music at the Hochschule für Musik Franz Liszt, Weimar from 1959 to 1963. He then worked as a music teacher in Stralsund. From 1969 to 1973, he studied composition with Johann Cilenšek and Werner Hübschmann at the Weimar Academy of Music. In 1981, he was awarded the Hanns Eisler Prize. From 1982 to 1988, he worked as a dramaturge at the Theatre of West Pomerania. At the same time, he was Meisterschüler for composition with Siegfried Matthus at the Academy of Arts, Berlin (East). From 1988 to 2005, he was a lecturer in composition and ear training at the Hochschule für Musik und Theater Rostock. From 1992 to 2002 he held the office of deputy chairman of the Mecklenburg-Vorpommern regional association of the Deutscher Komponistenverband.

He composed several pieces, including an opera.

== Work ==
- Kassandra (opera)
- Canzona for viola and piano
- Concertino for piano and orchestra.
- Siebengesang for voice and chamber ensemble.
- Marionettes for alto recorder and piano.
- Variations on Jesu, meine Freude for organ

== Filmography ==
- 1981: David und Goliath
