= Friedrich Aue =

German resistance fighter (1896–1944)

Friedrich Aue (27 July 1896 – 27 November 1944) was a German resistance fighter against the regime of Nazi Germany.

Aue was a locksmith from Dodendorf (a part of Sülzetal), Prussian Saxony. In 1925 he joined the Communist Party of Germany (KPD). After Adolf Hitler seized power in 1933, Aue became involved in the resistance to Nazi rule. In February 1944, he was arrested by the Gestapo. Aue was sentenced to death on 25 October 1944. The sentence was carried out at the labour prison Zuchthaus Brandenburg in Brandenburg an der Havel.

The city of Magdeburg has named a street, Friedrich-Aue-Straße, in his honour.
