= Johannes Schlecht =

German composer

Johannes Schlecht (born 27 November 1948) is a German composer.

== Life ==
Born in Neuhaus-Schierschnitz, After graduating from high school, Schlecht studied theology at the University of Jena. This was followed by musical correspondence studies at the Hochschule für Musik Franz Liszt, Weimar. Private conducting and composition studies followed with Manfred Fabricius and Reiner Bredemeyer. He has worked as a freelance composer since 1975.

== Awards ==
- 1989: Hanns Eisler Prize

== Film music ==
- 1988: Kai aus der Kiste
- 1990: Olle Hexe
- 1991: The Girl in the Lift
