= Reiner Dennewitz =

German composer

Reiner Dennewitz (born 21 February 1937) is a German composer.

== Life ==
Dennewitz was born in Sundhausen. After the Abitur he passed at the Schnepfenthal Salzmann School, he studied composition with Johann Cilenšek and piano with Siegfried Rapp at the Hochschule für Musik Franz Liszt, Weimar. Afterwards he was a master student for composition with Fritz Geißler at the Academy of Arts, Berlin. He then worked as a music teacher and freelance composer. His compositions were performed by the Thomanerchor and Canzonetta Chamber Choir Leipzig, among others. He created solo songs, chamber music, orchestral works and choral music.

== Awards ==
- 1976: 3rd prize for chamber music at the GDR Music Days
- 1980: Art Prize of the Gera District
- 1983: Hanns Eisler Prize of the DDR radio station
