= Willy Focke =

20th-century German composer

Willy Focke (born 1949) is a German composer.

== Life ==
In 1973, Focke received a 3rd prize at the Dresden Weber Competition. In 1976, he was awarded the Hanns Eisler Prize by Radio DDR. In the same year, he received the 1st prize at the Chamber Music Competition of the GDR Music Days. His works are published by Edition Peters and have been performed among others by the String Quartet of the Komische Oper Berlin and at chamber music evenings of the Staatskapelle Dresden. In addition, he received commissions from the Konzerthalle Carl Philipp Emanuel Bach Frankfurt (Oder).

== Work ==
- Concerto for Basset Horn and Orchestra
- String Quartet I with Baritone solo on a poem by Johannes R. Becher, op. 13
- String Quartet II
- Fünf Duos für Bratsche und Klarinette, Op. 3.
- Drei Sonette von Francesco Petrarca for one voice and harpsichord.
- Epitaph für Carl Philipp Emanuel Bach, Divertimento for oboe, violoncello and harpsichord
- Und wo die erste Reihe geht (song)
