= Franz Jung (conductor) =

German pianist, music educator and conductor

Franz Jung (1899 − 1978) was a German pianist, music educator and conductor.

== Life ==
Jung began his career as a solo répétiteur at the Semperoper in Dresden. Due to the performance of Der fliegende Holländer by Richard Wagner, which he conducted there with great success, Jung was engaged in 1924 at the Theater Erfurt as 1st Kapellmeister after Erfurt.

At the age of 25, he was appointed general music director of the Stadttheater Erfurt. He worked there until his appointment to the Dresden Philharmonic by Heinz Bongartz. In Erfurt Kurt Masur was 1st Kapellmeister under him. In Dresden Masur was his successor from 1955.

Jung took over guest directorships, e.g. in Weimar, Belgrad (1943) and Rostock and taught as a professor at the state conservatories and music academies in Erfurt, Leipzig and Weimar. Among his students were Dieter Zechlin, and Eduard Lehmstedt (later music director of the Deutsches Nationaltheater und Staatskapelle Weimar) Kurt Dietmar Richter and Siegfried Thiele.

Jung was a member of the Akademie gemeinnütziger Wissenschaften zu Erfurt.

== World premieres ==
- Paul Hindemith: Hin und zurück (1928).
- Paul Hindemith: Neues vom Tage (1929).
- Ottmar Gerster: Enoch Arden – Der Möwenschrei (1938).
