= Philipp Kochheim =

German writer

Philipp Kochheim (born 4 December 1970) is a German theatre director, author and scenic designer. He also wrote the libretto for the opera Kniefall von Warschau named after Willy Brandt's genuflexion in Warsaw on 7 December 1970, with music by Gerhard Rosenfeld, which premiered in 1997 in the Opernhaus Dortmund, directed by John Dew.

== Life ==
Born in Hamburg, Kochheim began playing the piano at the age of 7. As a teenager he attended productions of Peter Zadek, which aroused his interest in theatre. He studied art history in Munich, with the minor subjects Neue Deutsche Literatur and theatre studies. In the season 1992/93 he attended a performance of Verdi's Un ballo in maschera and afterwards turned his attention increasingly to music theatre. During an internship at the Staatstheater Augsburg he got to know John Dew and accompanied him occasionally as an assistant at the Vienna State Opera. In 1995 Kochheim finished his studies with a Master of Arts and worked for five years as Dew's assistant at the Theater Dortmund.

From 1997 Kochheim became famous through his own staging and scenic design, first during his assistant period in Dortmund, where he directed Gogol's Diary of a Madman. In 2001 he directed the premiere of Erkki-Sven Tüür's Holocaust-opera Wallenberg at the Dortmund Opera House. Afterwards, he worked as a freelance director at various opera houses. Thus in 2003 he staged Offenbach's The Tales of Hoffmann; Donizetti's L'elisir d'amore, Bizet's Carmenat the Staatstheater Oldenburg and Mozart's Così fan tutte at Heidelberg theater. In the following year Kochheim's unsuccessful attempt to cast the play Waiting for Godot at the Landesbühne Niedersachsen Nord with two women attracted media attention. The S. Fischer Verlag banned the performance according to the instructions of the author Samuel Beckett, who wished only men in the four roles.

In 2004, director John Dew appointed Kochheim chief director of the opera at the Staatstheater Darmstadt. However, they had artistic differences and in 2008 Kochheim left the house again. Subsequently, he worked among others in 2009 at Staatstheater Kassel, in 2010 at Bühnen der Stadt Gera and since 2011 at Theater Chemnitz, where he performed Nicolai's opera Die Heimkehr des Verbannten. Since 2009 Kochheim has also been staging musicals like Hair, West Side Story and Evita in addition to classical plays. The latter was performed in February 2012 at Theater Regensburg. From March 2013 to August 2017 he was engaged as opera director at the Staatstheater Braunschweig and staged here among others Jenő Hubay's Anna Karenina, Astor Piazzolla's María de Buenos Aires, Herrmann's Wuthering Heights and the musical Ragtime.

Since 1 May 2017, Kochheim has been director of Den Jyske Opera (Dänische Nationaloper Aarhus).

On 24 January 2018 accusations of "sexualised abuse of power" were made against Kochheim, who had previously rehearsed his musical production Ragtime at the Graz Opera. He had, already as opera director at Staatstheater Braunschweig, contacted several actresses via Facebook, sexually harassed them and thereby abused his position as director.

Kochheim's own plays include "C.Q.D". (premiere in Dortmund, 1998) and Tschaikowsky (premiere in Wilhelmshaven 2002). He also wrote the libretto for the opera Kniefall von Warschau named after Willy Brandt's genuflexion in Warsaw on 7 December 1970, (music Gerhard Rosenfeld), which premiered in 1997 in Dortmund under the direction of Dew.

== Publications ==
- Kniefall in Warschau Parthas-Verlag, Berlin 1998.
- C.Q.D. Hartmann und Stauffacher, Cologne 1998.
- TSCHAIKOWSKY. Hartmann und Stauffacher, Cologne 2002.

== Awards ==
- 2003 Dr. Otto Kasten Stiftung as best Nachwuchsregisseur
- 2004 Götz-Friedrich-Preis for the staging of Wagner's Tannhäuser in Heidelberg
- Since 2006 he has been a member of the International Theatre Institute.
- 2013 Theaterpreis Hamburg – Rolf Mares in the category Herausragende Inszenierung/Aufführung for the production of Lauter Verrückte in the Theater für Kinder.
