= Kurt Dietmar Richter =

German composer and conductor (1931–2019)

Kurt Dietmar Richter (24 September 1931 − 15 January 2019) was a German composer and conductor.

== Life ==
Richter was born on September 24, 1931, in Plzeň (Czechoslovakia). His father was Gymnasium professor. At the urging of his mother he attended a music school, where he was appointed assistant concertmaster at the age of twelve. After the war his family moved from Sudetenland to Erfurt.

== Musical career ==
Richter was a member of the Thuringian Boys Choir in his childhood. From 1946 to 1949 he attended the Landesschule Pforta. He studied with Dieter Zechlin and Franz Jung at the Thuringian State Conservatory in Erfurt. Inspired by his Erfurt music teacher, he was fascinated among others by Paul Hindemith and the New Music. Later he was a master student with Johann Cilenšek at the Academy of Arts, Berlin. He then worked as conductor at the municipal Döbeln and Theater Erfurt, at the Greifswald Theatre and at the Schweriner Philharmonie. In 1990 he founded the Berlin artist initiative die neue brücke. His works have been performed among others at the Schauspielhaus Berlin, the Theater Greifswald and the Konzerthaus Berlin.

Richter died in Berlin at the age of 87.

== Awards ==
- 1948: a-cappella choir prize of the Landesschule Pforta
- 1977: 4th Prize at the International TV Opera Competition Salzburg/UNESCO
- 1980: Carl Maria von Weber Prize of the city of Dresden
- 1982: Carl Maria von Weber Prize of the city of Dresden
- 1984: Hanns Eisler Prize
- 1993: Paul Woitschach Prize
- 1995: Württemberg Composition Prize
- 1996: Saarlouis Composition Prize
- 1999: Composition Prize of the Chorverband Nordrhein-Westfalen
- 2000: Spanish a-cappella choir prize
- 2001: Composition Prize of the Weimar Spring Days for Contemporary Music
- 2003: Composition Prize of the State of Brandenburg
- 2004: Friedrich Silcher Composition Prize Württemberg
- 2005: Prize at the composition competition of the Humanistischer Verband Deutschlands

== Compositions ==
- 1962 Jugendoper Der fahrende Schüler
- 1964 Opera Pazifik
- 1970 Sekundenoper
- 1977 TV-Opera Bewährung über den Wolken (Deutscher Fernsehfunk)
- 1978 Opera Der verlegene Magistrat
- 1982 Opera Die Geschichte von Liebe und Salz
- 1984 Mini-Opera Marx spielte gern Schach
- 1985 Opera Adam und Eva

== Radio play music ==
- 1990: Lev Lunts: Die Stadt der Gerechtigkeit – Director: Peter Groeger (Hörspiel – Funkhaus Berlin)
