= Wolfgang Strauß =

German composer and conductor (1927–2018)

Wolfgang Strauß (22 July 1927 – 5 April 2018) was a German composer and conductor.

== Life ==
Born in Dresden, After his Abitur, Strauß studied at the Hochschule für Musik Carl Maria von Weber with Fidelio F. Finke (composition and Kapellmeister), Ernst Hintze (conducting) and Elfriede Clemen (piano). From 1951 to 1955, he was principal répétiteur and Kapellmeister at the Oper Leipzig and then took over the position of 1st Kapellmeister at the Theater an der Altmark in Stendal. From 1960, he worked at the Berliner Rundfunk and in the following years he held a position of responsibility as editor-in-chief for E- und U-Musik until 1979, especially for the two radio orchestras in Berlin. Among other things, he worked out concert programmes, negotiated with conductors and soloists for their realisation and accompanied the Rundfunk-Sinfonieorchester Berlin on its guest performances abroad. When several musicians left during a trip to Western Europe in 1979, he fell victim to political intrigue on his return and was dismissed without notice. He then returned to his hometown of Dresden, where he found a new, fulfilling position as a lecturer at the Hochschule für Musik Carl Maria von Weber in Dresden from 1980 onwards.

After being rejected twice before the fall of the Berlin Wall, he was appointed honorary professor there in 1994. At the age of almost 70, he finally ended his teaching career.

His musical estate is kept in the Saxon State and University Library Dresden.

Strauß died in Dresden at the age of 90.

== Compositions ==
Five Symphonies, Small Symphony in C, "Suite for the Night", "Ricercar", "Invitation à six conversations", "Modes for Orchestra", Concertante Variations, Concertino for piano and small orchestra, "Hexagram", 2nd Symphony for piano and small orchestra. Violin Concerto, Concerto for Orchestra, Suite for Chamber Orchestra, Dancing Variations for Solo Viola and Orchestra, Serenade for Chamber Orchestra, 2nd and 4th String Quartet, Piano Trio, Wind Octet, Love Song Cycle "Fetter und Flügel" after texts by Ulrich Grasnick, Piano Quartet, Sonatina for Flute and Harp

== Awards ==
- 1969: Hanns Eisler Prize
- 1974: Art Prize of the German Democratic Republic
- 1988: Martin-Andersen-Nexö-Kunstpreis
