= Alexander Beer =

German architect (1873–1944)

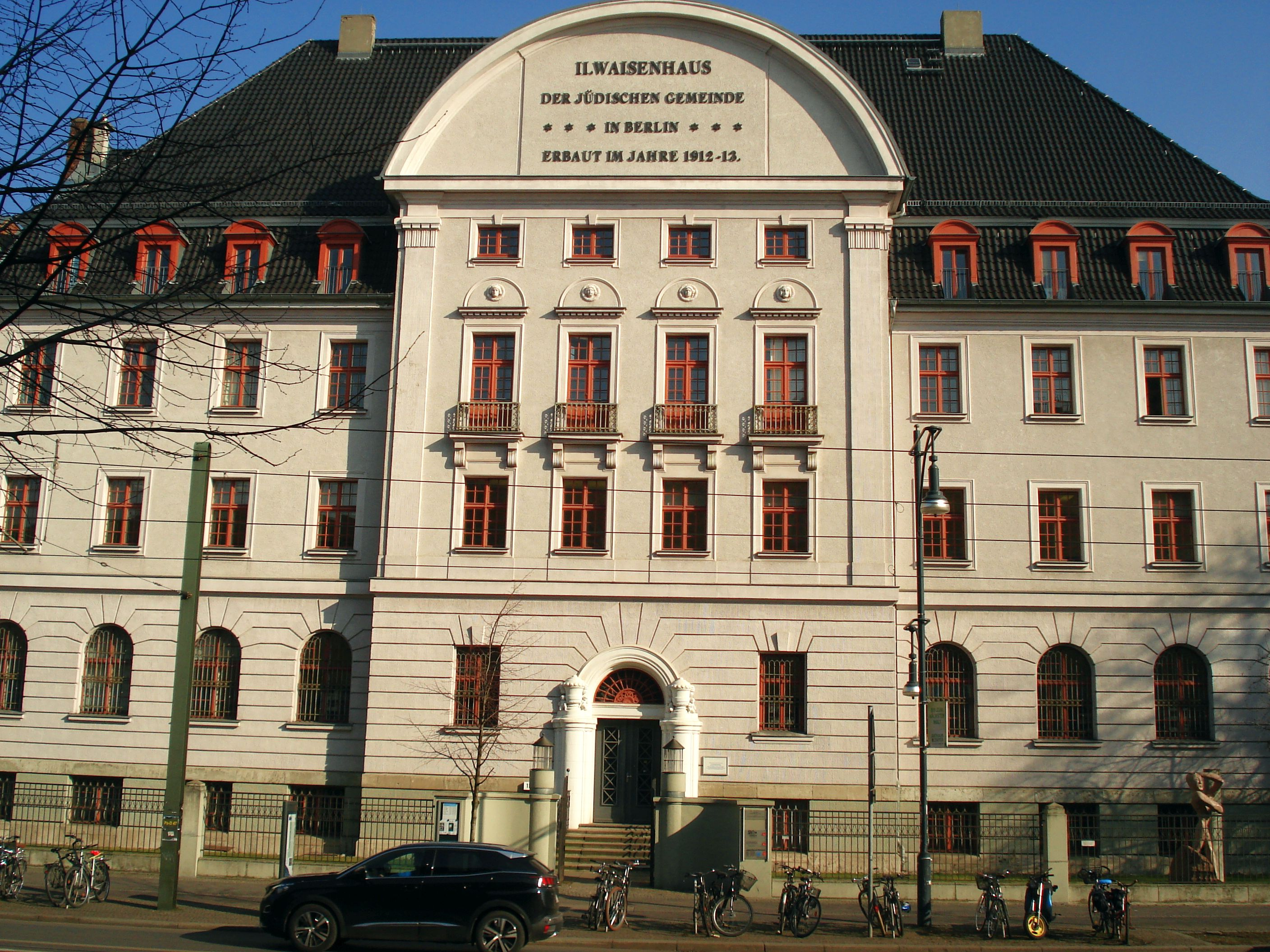
former Jewish orphanage in Berlin-Pankow, built 1912–13, today library

Alexander (Alex) Beer (10 September 1873 – 8 May 1944) was a German architect.

== Life ==
Beer was born in Hammerstein (Czarne), West Prussia. He studied in Berlin and Darmstadt. His first employment was in Mainz, where he restored and refurbished government buildings for the state of Hesse as a Grossherzoglicher Regierungsbaumeister (Grand Ducal Governmental Architect in Chief, documented as early as 2 December 1905). Following serious funding problems and the subsequent collapse of Hesse's building program, and possibly also due to him being Jewish, Beer could not find promotion in this position. While still holding his status as a civil servant for life time, he finally left his post to take on that of a Gemeindebaumeister (Community Architect in Chief), offered to him by the Jewish Community in Berlin. Among the works Beer created during his employment are:

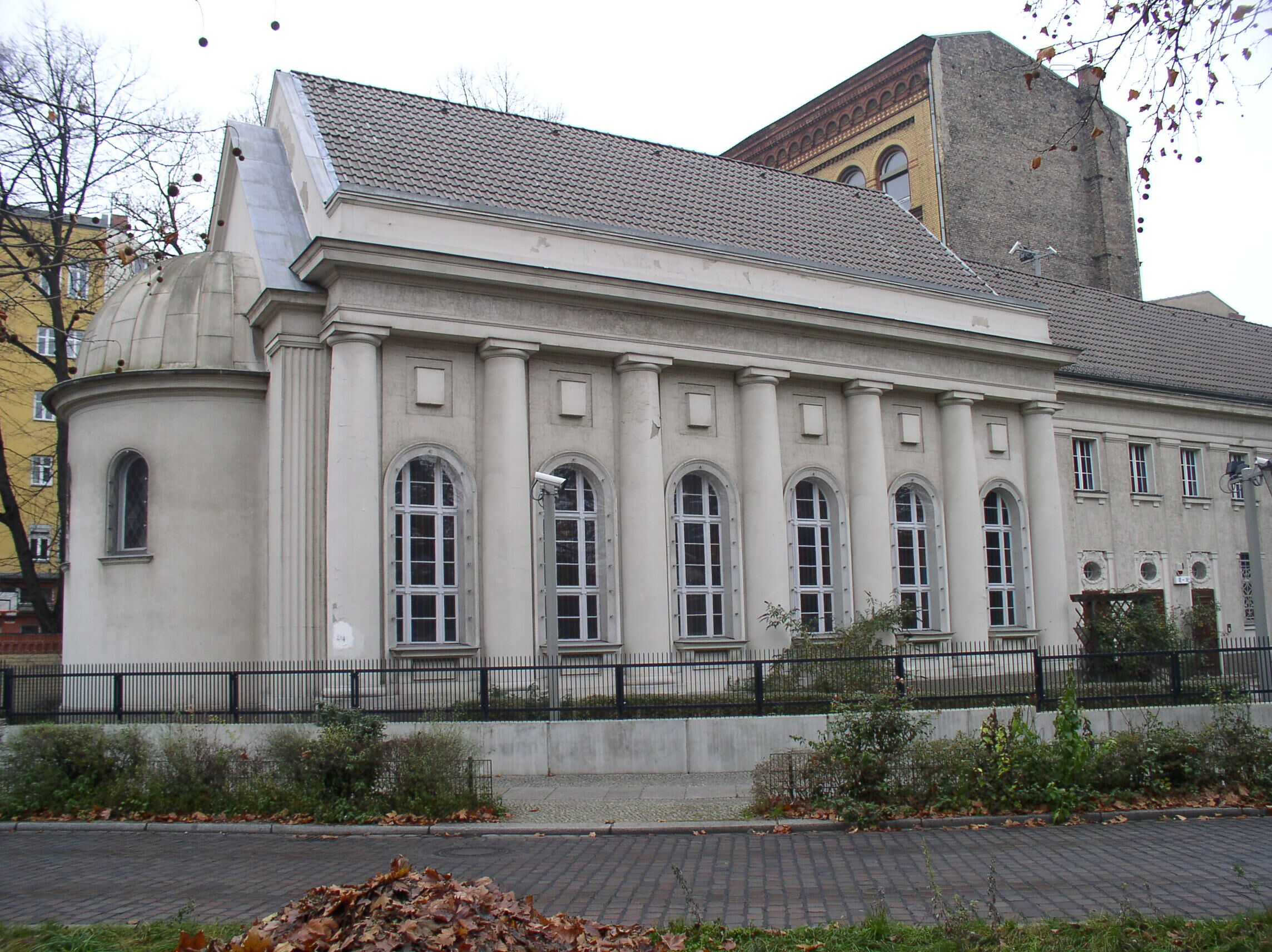
An orthodox synagogue by Alexander Beer.

- A large Jewish orphanage in Berlin-Pankow (1913);
- An orthodox synagogue in Berlin-Kreuzberg (1913–16);
- A memorial for 395 fallen Berlin Jewish soldiers of World War I in the Jewish Cemetery, Berlin-Weissensee (1924–27);
- A Girls’ School in Berlin-Mitte;
- A liberal synagogue in Berlin-Wilmersdorf (1928–30, inauguration ceremony on 16 September 1930). This, together with a residence for the elderly in Berlin-Schmargendorf, Berkaer Str. 31–35 (built between 1929 and 1931), was widely regarded as his most important achievement.

Other, lesser commissions included the reconstruction, refurbishment and maintenance of various buildings owned by the Berlin Jewish Community.

== World War II ==
All of Beer's works were seriously damaged during the era of Nazi Germany. The most dramatic vandalism was the torching of the Prinzregentenstrasse synagogue, Berlin-Wilmersdorf, during the so-called Kristallnacht raids of 9–10 November 1938. Before he was deported, the Nazis even forced Beer to change the remains of the torched synagogue into a granary. Today, a memorial plaque at Prinzregentenstr. 69–70 commemorates the destroyed synagogue. Since 2000, also some other buildings by Alexander Beer have been restored, mostly with private funding.

The initially Jewish home for the elderly (Jüdisches Altersheim) in Berlin-Schmargendorf (at Berkaer Str. 31–35) with its large inner courtyard was seized by the SS in 1941 and immediately repurposed as a counter intelligence command center, all remaining inhabitants and staff were deported and murdered. Between 1945 and 1954, the building was used as British antitank barracks and also as an officer's casino. A major renovation took place between 1954 and 1956. After this, the former Jewish community retirement home belonged to the Wilmersdorf Hospital. After the latter's closure in 1982, the Berkaer Str. site was reallocated to the city hospital center Max-Bürger-Krankenhaus, which was later renamed to Max-Bürger-Zentrum MBZ. In close administrative relation to the larger geriatric hospital site Max-Bürger-Krankenhaus at Sophie-Charlotte-Str. (Berlin-Charlottenburg), the Berkaer Str. building by Alexander Beer served as a geriatric hospital until the early 2000s. Following Berlin's extensive hospital environment reorganisations which went into planning stage in 1998, the historically preserved site then also became part of Berlin's communal Vivantes chain (owned by the federal state of Berlin) and was again thoroughly modernized between 2009 and 2011. Today it serves as a geriatric nursing facility, now named Vivantes Hauptstadtpflege Haus Wilmersdorf (Vivantes Capital City Care, Wilmersdorf site).

== Marriage ==
Beer married Alice Fanny Davidsohn on 8 August 1924. She died of cancer on 5 November 1941. On 17 March 1943, Beer was deported to Theresienstadt concentration camp, where he died on 8 May 1944, most probably due to starvation. His daughter, Beate Hammett (née Beer, born 9 May 1929) was saved by a 1939 children transport to the UK and now lives in Sydney, Australia.
