= Akademie der Künste der DDR =

East-German art institute

- Akademie der Künste der Deutschen Demokratischen Republik
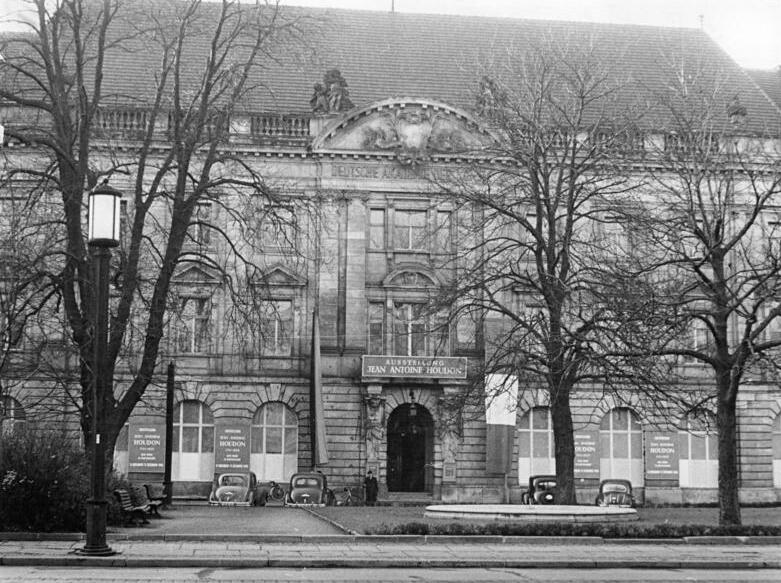
- Merged into: Academy of Arts, Berlin
- Established: 24 March 1950
- Dissolved: 1993
- Type: Academy of arts
- Location: Berlin, Germany
- Official language: German
- Formerly called: Deutsche Akademie der Künste (1950–1974)

The Akademie der Künste der DDR was the central art academy of the German Democratic Republic (GDR; German: Deutsche Demokratische Republik, DDR). It existed under different names from 1950 to 1993. Then it merged with the "Akademie der Künste Berlin (West)" to become the Academy of Arts, Berlin.

== History ==
=== Deutsche Akademie der Künste ===
The Deutsche Akademie der Künste was founded on 24 March 1950. The founding act was performed by minister president of the GDR, Otto Grotewohl. It considered itself the legal successor to the Prussian Academy of Arts. The provisional location was the Kaiserin-Friedrich-Haus at Robert-Koch-Platz 7 in Berlin-Mitte.

At the old location in the Ernst von Ihne extension of the Palais Arnim at Pariser Platz 4 in front of the Brandenburg Gate, (where the new building of the current Academy of Arts is located), archive, office, magazine and event rooms were housed from 1952.

=== Akademie der Künste der DDR ===
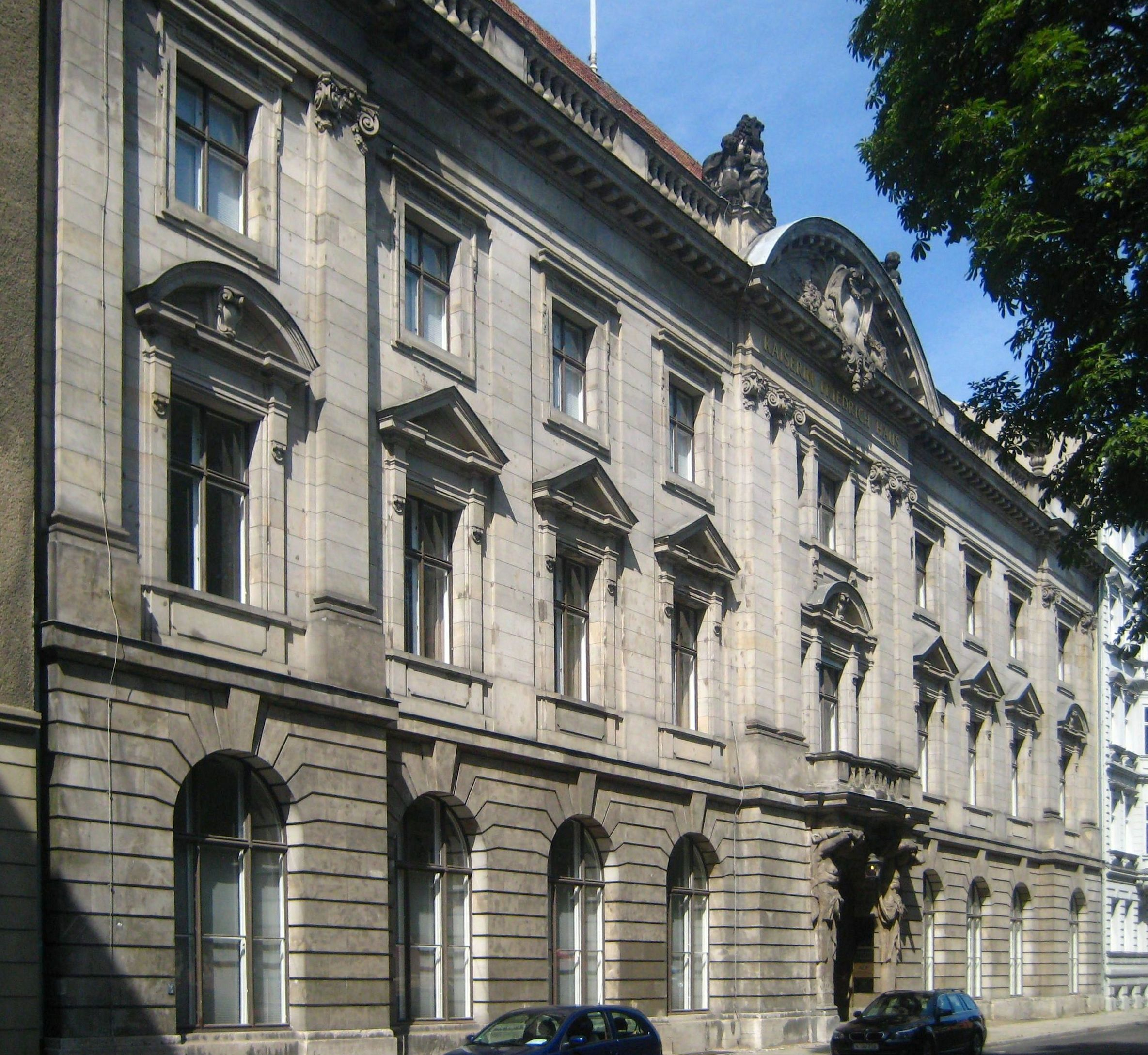
Kaiserin-Friedrich-Haus

In April 1974, it received the designation Akademie der Künste der Deutschen Demokratischen Republik (AdK, Academy of Arts of the German Democratic Republic). The AdK "helps with the development and dissemination of a partisan and popular art of socialist realism, which contributes to the formation of socialist personalities, an art which enriches the spiritual life of the people and acts as a component of the culturally rich way of life under socialism. It makes an important contribution to the research, cultivation, development and dissemination of the cultural and artistic heritage." (Statute of the AdK of the GDR of 26 January 1978)

In 1976, it moved into the Langenbeck-Virchow-Haus at Luisenstraße 58/59 near the Charité. This had become vacant after the move of the Volkskammer of the GDR to the Palast der Republik. In 1987, after more than ten years of restoration work, the building at Robert-Koch-Platz was occupied again.

=== Akademie der Künste zu Berlin ===
From 1990 it bore the name "Akademie der Künste zu Berlin".

It merged with the "Akademie der Künste Berlin (West)" into the joint Academy of Arts, Berlin in 1993.

== Archives ==
Today, the administrative documents are mostly located in the Archiv der Akademie der Künste.

== Activities ==
=== Sections ===
The Academy was divided into different sections

- Literature and philology
- Fine arts
- Music
- Performing arts

=== Activities ===
In addition to exhibitions, concerts, readings, conferences, symposia and archiving, the extensive activities also included the supervision of numerous artists.

=== Master classes ===
Highly regarded were master classes with such prominent teachers as Hanns Eisler, Paul Dessau, Günter Kochan and Dieter Zechlin (music), as well as Fritz Cremer, Gustav Seitz and Werner Klemke (fine arts).

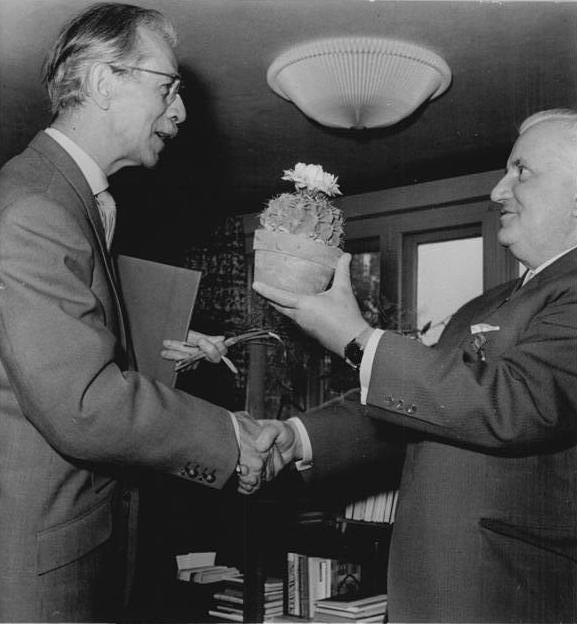
Otto Nagel congratulates Willi Bredel on his 60th birthday on behalf of the Academy, 1961

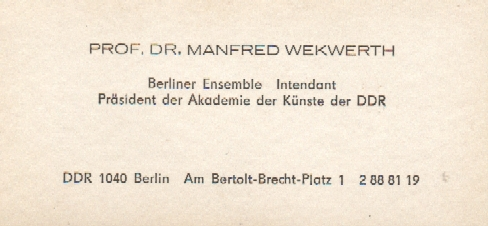
Business card Manfred Wekwerth

== Presidents ==
- Heinrich Mann, 1950 (nominell)
- Arnold Zweig, 1950–1953
- Johannes R. Becher, 1953–1956
- Otto Nagel, 1956–1962
- Willi Bredel, 1962–1964
- Konrad Wolf, 1965–1982
- Manfred Wekwerth, 1982–1990
- Heiner Müller, 1990–1993

Paul Dessau (1957–62), Ernst Hermann Meyer (1965–69), Dieter Zechlin (1970–78), Fritz Cremer (1974–83), Wieland Förster (1979–90), Werner Stötzer (1990–93), Ruth Zechlin (1990–93) were among the vice-presidents.

== Members ==
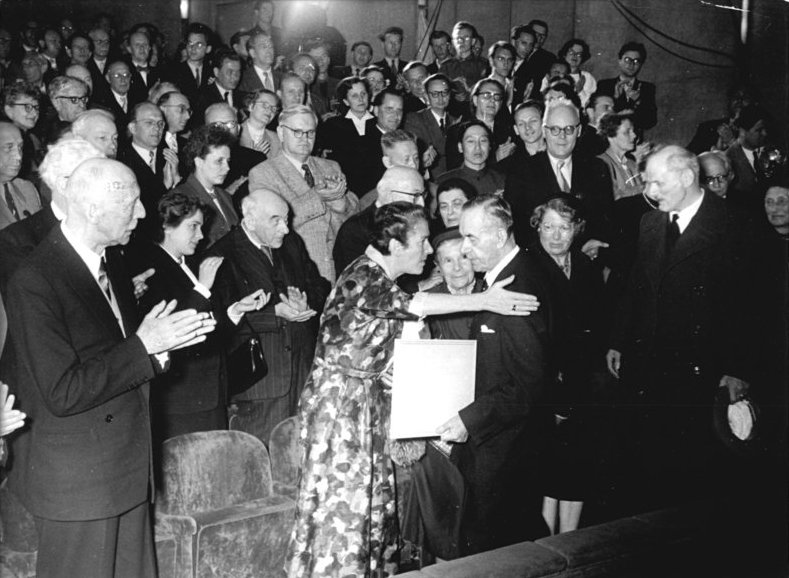
Deutsche Akademie der Künste. (2nd and 3rd from left.): Hadwig Klemperer and Victor Klemperer. (14 May 1955)

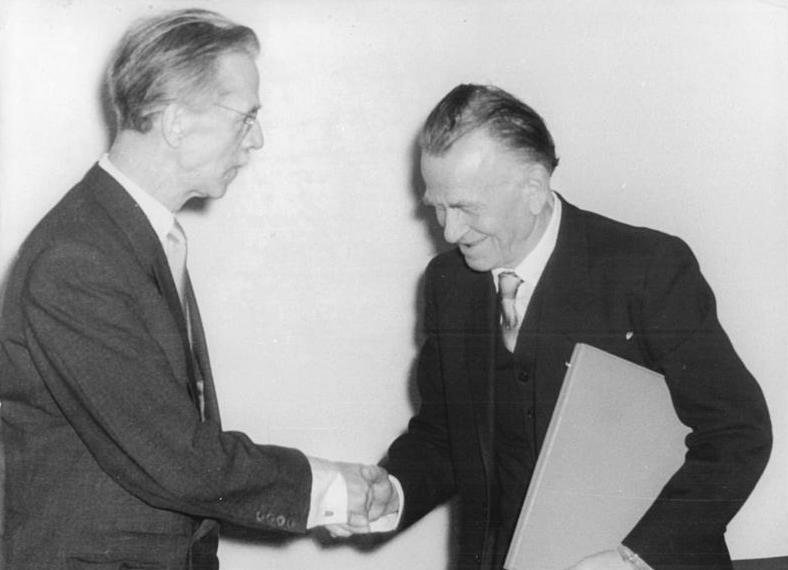
Otto Dix is appointed "Corresponding Member" (1957)

Membership of the Academy was an honour, awarded for special artistic achievements. The founding members included among others Johannes R. Becher, Bertolt Brecht, Hanns Eisler, Otto Nagel, Anna Seghers, Helene Weigel and Friedrich Wolf. Other ordinary members were among others Fritz Cremer, and Paul Dessau.

Thomas Mann was appointed honorary member in 1955

The Corresponding Members included among others Benjamin Britten, Charles Chaplin, Aram Khachaturian, Otto Dix, Hans Erni, Gabriel García Márquez, Pablo Neruda, Laurence Olivier and Pablo Picasso.

== Prizes ==
The prizes awarded by the Academy were:

- Heinrich Mann Prize for essay writing (since 1953),
- Käthe Kollwitz Prize for visual arts (since 1960),
- Lion Feuchtwanger Prize for historical prose (since 1971),
- Alex Wedding Prize for children's and youth literature (since 1968),
- F.-C. Weiskopf Prize for particularly "language-critical and language-accentuating" literature (since 1957),
- Will Lammert Prize for young sculptors (since 1962),
- Anna Seghers Prize for young authors (since 1986)
- Konrad Wolf Prize for the performing arts (since 1988)
