= Rainer Böhm =

German composer

- Origin: Ravensburg, Germany
- Genres: Modern Jazz; Cool Jazz
- Years active: 2003–present
- Labels: Enja Records; Jazz4Ever; Pirouet; Laika; ACT
- Website: rainerboehm.de

Rainer Böhm (23 February 1952 – 21 May 2013) was a German composer.

== Life ==
Born in Berlin, Böhm studied composition and conducting at the Hochschule für Musik "Hanns Eisler". Afterwards he was a master student for composition at the Academy of Arts, Berlin. In 1984 he became musical director at the Berliner Ensemble. He worked with theatre directors such as Heiner Müller, Christoph Schroth, Claus Peymann and Manfred Wekwerth. He also wrote several scores for the documentary film director Volker Koepp.

Böhm died in Berlin at the age of 61.

== Awards ==
- 1978: Critics Prize of the Berliner Zeitung.
- 1982: Critics Prize of the Berliner Zeitung.
- 1983: Hanns Eisler Prize

== Film musics ==
- 1971: Frankfurter Tor
- 1976: Mama, I'm Alive
- 1976: Hostess
- 1979: Am Fluss
- 1979: Tag für Tag
- 1980: Blaue Pferde auf rotem Gras (Theatre recording)
- 1982: In Rheinsberg
- 1981: Verflucht und geliebt
- 1981: Casanova auf Schloss Dux (Television play)
- 1983: Mein Vater ist ein Dieb
- 1984: Leben in Wittstock
- 1984: Iphigenie in Aulis (Theatre recording)
- 1984: Amok
- 1985: Ete und Ali
- 1989: Die Beteiligten
- 1991: Letzte Liebe
- 1993: Adamski
- 1998: Victor Klemperer – Mein Leben ist so sündhaft lang
- 2002: Uckermark
- 2005: Schattenland – Reise nach Masuren
- 2007: Holunderblüte
- 2007: Söhne
- 2009: Berlin-Stettin

== Radio play music ==
- 1978: Erich Schlossarek Der Aufschub – director: Christoph Schroth (radio play – Rundfunk der DDR)
