= Kaiserin-Friedrich-Haus =

Building in Berlin-Mitte, Germany

Coordinates: 52.5278°N 13.3780°E

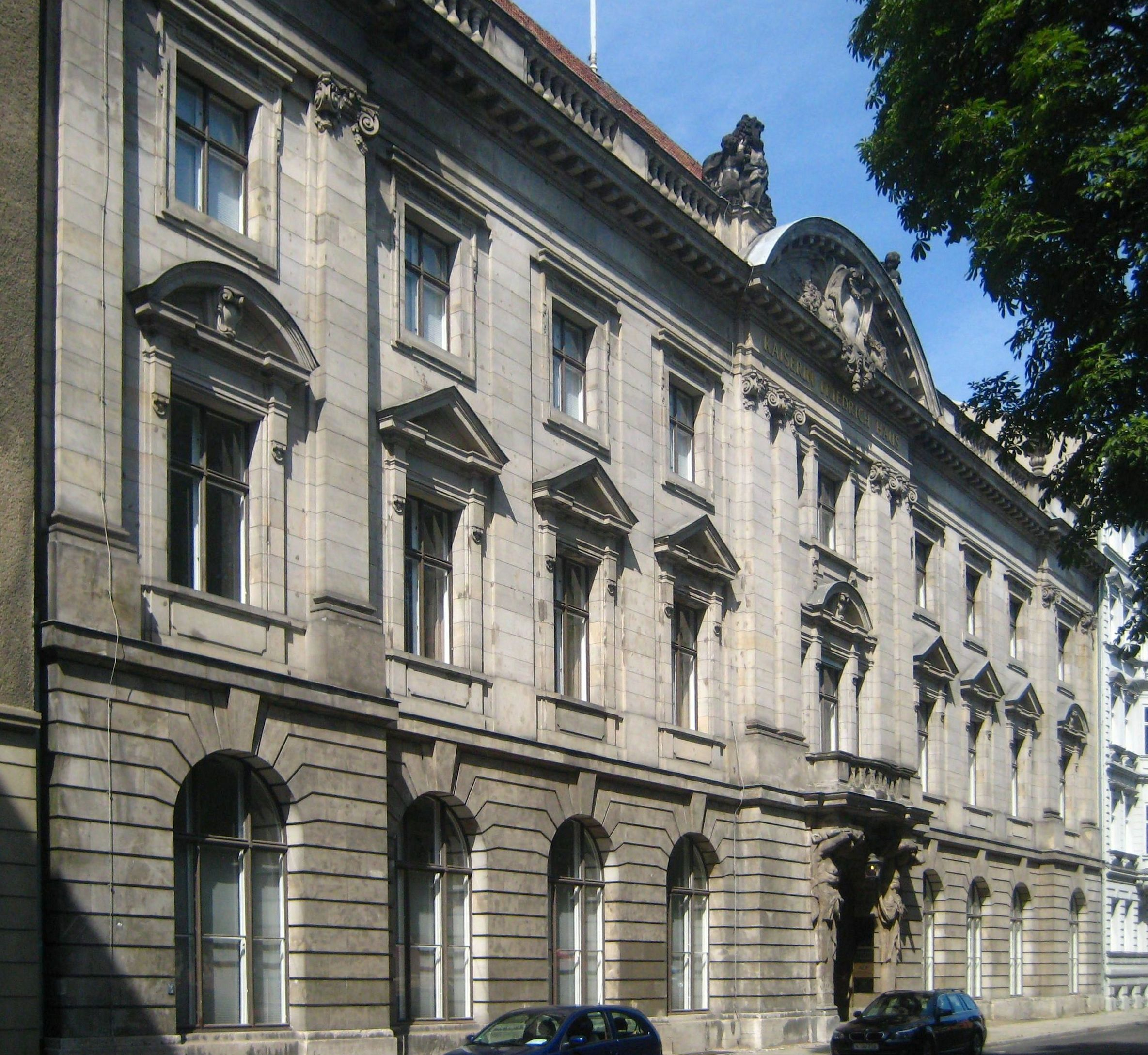

General information
- Location: Berlin-Mitte, Germany
- Year built: 1904-1906

Design and construction
- Architect: Ernst von Ihne

Kaiserin-Friedrich-Haus is a building located at Robert-Koch-Platz 7 in Berlin-Mitte, Germany. It is owned by the Kaiserin Friedrich Foundation and serves as its headquarters as well as that of various medical societies.

== Creation ==
It was built between 1904 and 1906 according to plans by the court architect Ernst von Ihne to provide medical profession of a place for advanced medical training and continuing education's activities. The building was named after Empress Victoria, the widow of Emperor Friedrich III who died in 1901. She was a key supporter of the campaigns to promote medical training that led to the establishment of the foundation and the house.
