= Jewish Orphanage Berlin-Pankow =

- Jüdisches Waisenhaus
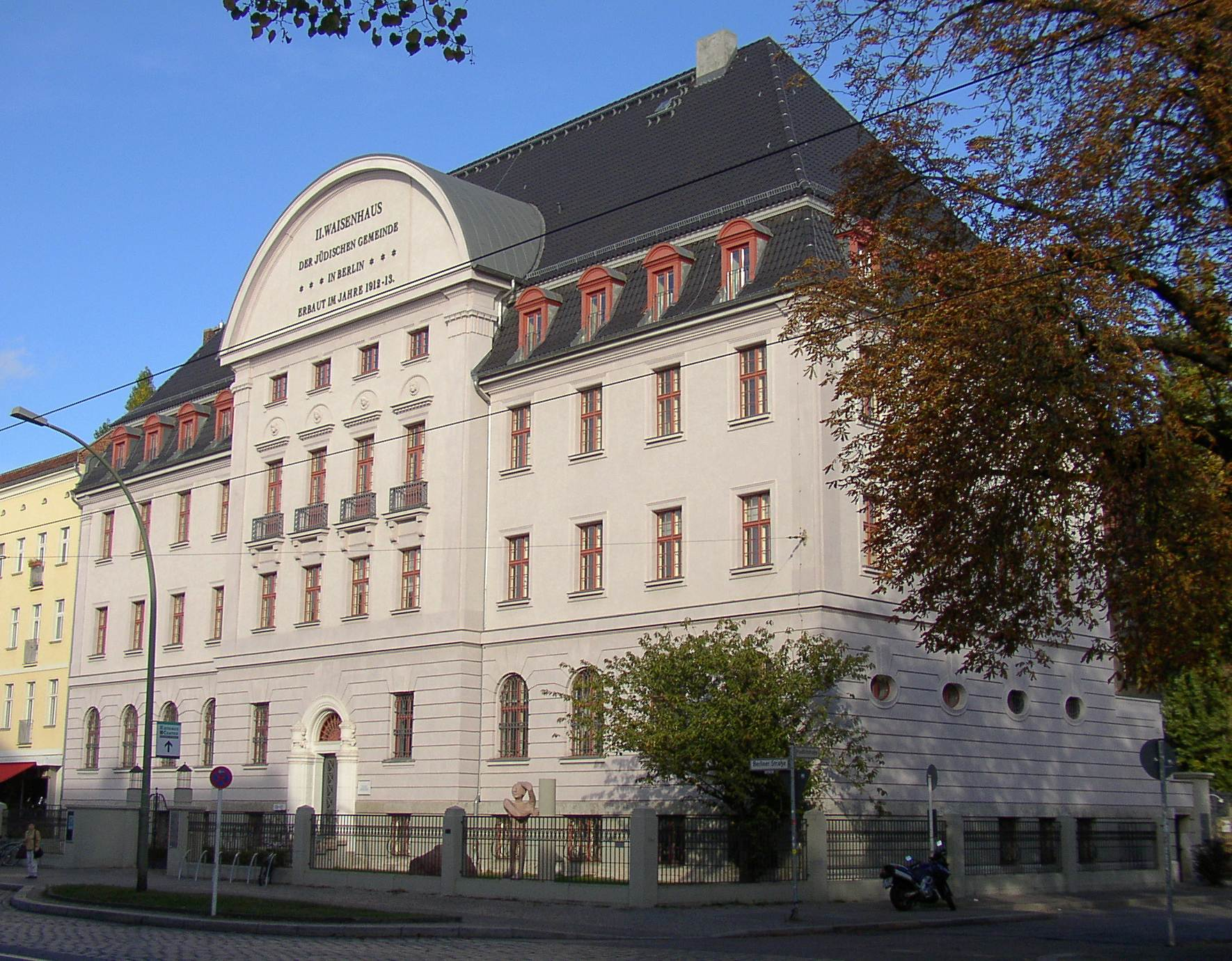
- The Jewish Berlin-Pankow Orphanage

- Location within Berlin
- Alternative names: English: Jewish Orphanage in Berlin; German: Jüdisches Waisenhaus Berlin

General information
- Status: In use
- Location: Pankow, Berlin, Germany
- Coordinates: 52°34′07″N 13°24′44″E

Design and construction
- Architect: Alexander Beer

Jewish Orphanage Berlin-Pankow (German: Jüdisches Waisenhaus) is a former Jewish orphanage and a listed building in Berlin-Pankow. It was built in 1882 to house refugee children. It was later destroyed by fire and a new building was erected on the same site in 1913. The orphanage was closed down in 1940 and the building fell into disrepair after Germany's reunification in 1990. It was acquired and restored by a charitable foundation in 1999 and now houses a school and a district library.

== History ==
The orphanage was originally intended to be a home for refugee children who had escaped the pogroms following the assassination of Emperor Alexander II of Russia in 1881. Due to the fact that many of the children had lost their parents, the Jewish community of Berlin converted the home into an orphanage in 1882. Later it was destroyed by fire, so a new building was erected on the very site following Alexander Beer's plans, who was the Architect for the building.

Following the November pogroms of 1938 the director of the orphanage, Kurt Crohn succeeded in saving the lives of many children by the means of kindertransports to the Netherlands and the United Kingdom, among these was Leslie Baruch Brent. The orphanage was forcibly closed in 1940 and the last residents were put into concentration camps in 1942. Between 1943 and 1945 the building was used by SS-Reichssicherheitshauptamt for its central endorsement department (German: Sichtvermerkstelle).

After 1945 the building briefly served the district's administration and East Germany's sports association. Between 1951 and 1971 it housed the embassy of Poland, followed by the embassy of Cuba until 1991. The building fell into disrepair and was acquired from its owner (the state of Israel) by the Dr. Walter and Margarete Cajewitz Foundation in 1999. After extensive restoration, the building has housed the district's Janusz Korczak library since 2001 and also a comprehensive school, SchuleEins, since 2007.

The memory of the Jewish orphanage is preserved by an association of friends and sponsors, among these are Jutta Limbach, Wolfgang Thierse and the late Christa Wolf.
