= F.-C. Weiskopf Prize =

Literary prize from East Germany

The F.-C. Weiskopf-Preis is a German literary prize. It was established in 1957.
