= Ursula Püschel =

German literary critic, journalist, and writer (1930–2018)

Ursula Püschel (1 June 1930 – 10 August 2018) was a German literary critic, journalist and writer. One focus of her activities was the work of the writer Bettina von Arnim, a representative of the Vormärz-Literatur.

== Life ==
Born in Töpchin, after Abitur in 1948, Püschel studied history and German studies at the Humboldt University of Berlin. She completed her studies in 1952 with the Staatsexamen. She then worked at the Akademie der Künste in Berlin in the Bettina von Arnim Archive until 1955. In 1965, she was awarded her doctorate with the Dissertation Bettina von Arnims politische Schriften presented at the Humboldt University.

In the following years she worked - in addition to her scientific work - for the press, radio, theatre, television and film. Since 1985, Püschel has worked as a freelance literary critic and essayist. She was particularly interested in literary criticism of publications by and about women.

== Bettina von Arnim ==
The Bettina von Arnim Archive, now in the Klassik Stiftung Weimar, came to the Akademie der Künste Berlin when manuscripts by Achim and Bettina were found in Arnim's mansion Schloss Wiepersdorf after the end of the war, which had not been sold at the auction of Arnim's estate in 1929. Among the papers, Püschel discovered handwritten drafts by Bettina von Arnim for the Poland brochure ("To the dissolved Prussian National Assembly"), which appeared anonymously in January 1849, in which she demanded a Poland free of Prussian property claims. Her authorship was denied in 1906 by the literary scholar Reinhold Steig, who knew the estate. Püschel published this brochure in 1954 for the first time since 1849 and for the first time with the name Bettina von Arnims as author.

Apart from a number of essays and books, Püschel's most important work was the publication of the writer's correspondence with King Frederick William IV of Prussia, which - as an important part of her work - except for a small part - had not been published until then and was still largely unknown. In 2004, the essay volume Bettina von Arnim - politisch was published.

Püschel died in Bernau bei Berlin at the age of 88.

- Bettina von Arnims Polenbroschüre. Henschelverlag, Berlin 1954
- und mehr als einmal nachts im Thiergarten. Bettina von Arnim und Heinrich Bernhard Oppenheim, Briefe 1841–1849. Schriftenreihe der Bettina-von-Arnim-Gesellschaft, Bettina-von-Arnim-Studien Band 1, Berlin 1990, ISBN 3-924894-31-0
- Wider die Philister und die bleierne Zeit. Untersuchungen, Essays, Aufsätze über Bettina von Arnim. Altberliner Bücherstube, Verlagsbuchhandlung Oliver Seifert, Berlin 1995, ISBN 3-930265-12-5
- Die Welt umwälzen – denn darauf läufts hinaus. Der Briefwechsel zwischen Bettina von Arnim und Friedrich Wilhelm IV. Aisthesis Verlag, Bielefeld 2001, ISBN 3-89528-312-6
- Bettina von Arnim – politisch. Erkundungen, Entdeckungen, Erkenntnisse. Aisthesis-Verlag, Bielefeld 2005, ISBN 3-89528-482-3

== Other works ==
- Unterwegs in meinen Dörfern: Bericht von Berlstedt am Ettersberg. Hinstorff Verlag, Rostock 1980.
- Mit allen Sinnen: Frauen in der Literatur; Essays. Mitteldeutscher Verlag, Halle and Leipzig 1982.
- Der Schlangenbaum: Eine Reise nach Moçambique. Mitteldeutscher Verlag, Halle und Leipzig 1984.
- Kernbauer: Auskünfte und Beobachtungen. Hinstorff, Rostock 1974.
- „… wider die Philister und die bleierne Zeit“: Untersuchungen, Essays, Aufsätze über Bettina von Arnim. Altberliner Bücherstube, Verlagsbuchhandlung Oliver Seifert, Berlin 1996.
