= List of works by Günter Kochan =

Günter Kochan (1930–2009) composed six symphonies, orchestral music and chamber music, one opera, cantatas, youth songs and mass songs as well as film music and radio dramas.

His compositions were mostly published by Edition Peters and by Deutschen Verlag für Musik in Leipzig as well as by Verlag Neue Musik in Berlin.

== Works ==
=== Instrumental music ===
==== Symphonies ====
- Symphony for large Orchestra with Choir (1962/64) based on words by Paul Wiens. UA 13 November 1963 in Oschatz (Thomas-Müntzer-Haus, Festtage Neuer Musik, Rundfunkchor Leipzig, Rundfunk-Sinfonieorchester Leipzig, Herbert Kegel)
- Symphony No. 2 for large Orchestra in one movement (1968). UA 21 February 1969 Berlin (II. Musik-Biennale Berlin, Berliner Sinfonieorchester, Kurt Sanderling)
- Symphony No. 3 for Orchestra with Soprano Solo "Dem Andenken Hanns Eislers gewidmet" (1972) based on words by Johannes R. Becher. UA 12 November 1973 Rostock (Philharmonisches Orchester Rostock, Roswitha Trexler (Soprano), Gerd Puls)
- Symphony No. 4 for Orchestra (1983/84). UA 1 Februar 1985 in Berlin (Schauspielhaus, X. Musik-Biennale Berlin, Sinfoniekonzert, Berliner Sinfonieorchester, Leitung: Claus Peter Flor)
- Symphony No. 5 for Orchestra (1985–87). UA 13/14/15 November 1987 in Berlin (Schauspielhaus, Sinfoniekonzert, Berliner Sinfonie-Orchester, Claus Peter Flor)
- Symphony No. 6 for Orchester (2003–06). UA 11/12 February 2011 in Berlin (Konzerthaus, 3. Konzert, Konzerthausorchester Berlin, Lothar Zagrosek)

==== Orchesterwerke ====
- Concerto for Violin and Orchestra in D major op. 1 (1951/52) (Version for Violin and Piano edited by Curt Beilschmidt)
- Polkas – heiteres Stück für großes Orchester (1955)
- Kleine Suite op. 13 (1956) from the Film Music Bärenburger Schnurre UA 1967
- Concerto for Piano and Orchestra op. 16 (1957/58). UA 9 November 1958 Dresden (Dresdner Philharmonie, Dieter Zechlin (Piano), Heinz Bongartz)
- Suite für Orchester Nr. 1 (1958)
- Fröhliche Ouvertüre für kleines Orchester op. 26 (1960) UA 1962
- Sinfonietta (1960). UA 19 November 1960 Dresden (Dresdner Philharmonie, Heinz Bongartz)
- Suite for Orchestra No. 2 „Goldoni-Suite“ (1961) from the Film Music Italienisches Capriccio. UA 1961
- 5 Sätze für Streichorchester (1961)
- Orchestral Variationens on Eisler's "Solidaritätslied" (1961). Collaboration by Andre Asriel, Fritz Geißler, Herbert Kirmße, Günter Kochan, Siegfried Köhler, Dieter Nowka, Joachim Werzlau und Ruth Zechlin
- Concerto for Orchestra (1962). UA 7 October 1962 in Leipzig (Kongresshalle, Rundfunk-Sinfonieorchester Leipzig, Herbert Kegel)
- Divertimento – Orchestral Variations on a theme by Carl Maria von Weber (1964). UA 1 February 1965 in Berlin (Berliner Sinfonieorchester, Kurt Sanderling)
- Concertino for Flute and small Orchestra (1964). UA 2 October 1964 in Dresden (Staatskapelle Dresden, Johannes Walter (Flute), Herbert Kegel)
- Fantasie for Flute and Orchestra (1965)
- Variations on a Venetian Canzonetta for Piano and small Orchestra (1966)
- Concerto for Violoncello and Orchestra (1967). UA 1 July 1969 in Rostock (Volkstheater, 1. Philharmonisches Konzert, Rostocker Theaterorchester, Friedemann Erben (Violoncello), Gerd Puls)
- Suite for Orchestra No. 3 (Rostocker Suite) (1969) from the Film Music Jubiläum einer Stadt – 750 Jahre Rostock
- Variations on a theme by Mendelssohn for Piano and Orchestra (1971/72) on the occasion of the 125th anniversary of the death of Felix Mendelssohn Bartholdy. UA 3 November 1972 in Berlin (Staatskapelle Berlin, Dieter Zechlin (Piano), Günther Herbig)
- Concerto for Viola and Orchestra (1973/74). UA 16 February 1975 in Berlin (Hallesche Philharmonie, Alfred Lipka (Viola), Olaf Koch)
- 2. Konzert für Violoncello und Orchester (1976). UA 5 May 1978 in Rostock (Philharmonisches Orchester Rostock, Jürnjakob Timm (Violoncello), Gerd Puls)
- Concerto for Wind Quintet and two String groups (1975–77). UA 18 February 1977 in Berlin (VI. Musik-Biennale Berlin, Staatskapelle Berlin, Bläserquintett der Staatskapelle Berlin, Alexander Dimitriew)
- Bilder aus dem Kombinat. 7 Pieces for Orchestra (1976/77). UA 30 June 1978 in Sonneberg (17. Arbeiterfestspiele, Arbeiter-Sinfonieorchester Bitterfeld, Arnfried-Joachim Eichhorn)
- Passacaglia and Hymn for large Orchestra (1979). UA 10 December 1979 in Halle (Hallesche Philharmonie, Olaf Koch)
- Concerto for Violin and Orchestra (1980). UA 19 February 1982 in Berlin (Deutsche Staatsoper, DDR-Musiktage 1982, Egon Morbitzer (Violin), Staatskapelle Berlin, Friedrich Goldmann)
- IN MEMORIAM. Music for Orchestra (1982). Dedication: Konrad Wolf and Paul Wiens. UA 15/16/17 December 1984 in Berlin (Schauspielhaus, Berliner Sinfonieorchester, Claus Peter Flor)
- Der Große Friede. Triptychon for Tenor, Horn, Timpani, Percussions and Strings (1986). Lyrics by Walter Lowenfels and Paul Wiens. UA 15 February 1987 in Berlin (XI. Musik-Biennale Berlin, Sinfoniekonzert, Sebastian Weigle (Horn), Gunter Wurzel (Tenor), Staatskapelle Berlin, Chihiro Hayashi)
- Präludium for large Orchestra. UA March 1986 in Berlin (FDJ-Sinfonieorchester der DDR, Reinhard Seehafer)
- Konzertante Szenen for 27 instrumental Solists. UA 14 April 1986 in Halle (Hallesche Philharmonie, Ude Nissen)
- Und ich lächle im Dunklen dem Leben. Music for Orchestra No. 2 (1987) based on letters by Rosa Luxemburg. UA 14/15/16 Februar 1989 in Karl-Marx-Stadt (Stadthalle, 6. Sinfoniekonzert der Robert-Schumann-Philharmonie Karl-Marx-Stadt, Dieter-Gerhardt Worm)
- Herbstbilder. Metamorphoses for 28 solo string instruments (1990/91)

==== Chamber music and piano work ====
- Sonate for two Pianos (1947)
- Two Sonatines for Piano (1948)
- Suite for Piano op. 2 (1952)
- Trio for Violin, Violoncello and Piano op. 4 (1954). UA 12 September 1954 in Dresden (Staatstheater, Gottfried Lucke (Violin), Clemens Dillner (Violoncello), Günter Blumhagen (Piano))
- Preludes, Intermezzi and Fugues for Piano op. 7 (1954)
- Divertimento for Flute, Clarinet and Bassoon op. 12 (1956). UA 1959 in Warschau (Warschauer Herbst, Members of the Gewandhaus-Bläserquintett)
- 11 kleine Stücke for Piano for four hands op. 20 (1959)
- Sonate for Violoncello and Piano (1958–61)
- 9 Kinderstücke for Piano (1960)
- 5 Sätze for Streichquartett (1961). UA (Gewandhaus-Quartett)
- Sonate for Violin and Piano (1962)
- Kleines Streichquartett in zwei Sätzen (1965)
- Sieben leichte Klavierstücke (1971)
- Fünf Klavierstücke: Capriccio, Andante, Fuge, Invention, Scherzo (1971). UA (Dieter Zechlin (Piano))
- String Quartet (1973/74). UA (Streichquartett der Deutschen Staatsoper Berlin)
- Klavierstück für D. Sch. (1974)
- Sieben Miniaturen for four Tubas (1977). UA 17 June 1978 in Los Angeles (Musikfestival, University of Southern California, Los Angeles-Tubaquartet: Roger Bobo, Tommy Johnson, Jim Self, Don Waldrop)
- Fantasy for Viola solo. UA 22 September 1980 in Berlin (Konzert der Musikhochschule Berlin, Alfred Lipka (Viola))
- String Trio [dedicated to Ernst Hermann Meyer to his 75th anniversary] (1979/80). UA 23 May 1981 in Dresden (Plenarsaal des Neuen Rathauses, Eröffnung der Dresdner Musikfestspiele 1981, Peter Glatte (Violin), Winfried Berger (Viola), Joachim Bischof (Violoncello))
- Piano Sonata (1981). UA 29 May 1981 in Dresden (Kongresssaal des Deutschen Hygienemuseums, Dresdner Musikfestspiele 1981, Annerose Schmidt (Piano))
- Sonata for Viola and Piano (1984/85). UA (Alfred Lipka (Viola), Dieter Zechlin (Piano))
- Variations for Piano (1986). UA 22 November 1987 in Berlin (Matinee im Apollo-Saal anlässlich des 30. Jubiläums des Verlages Neue Musik Berlin, Dieter Brauer (Piano))
- Fünf Bagatellen for four Trombones (1987). UA 25 Februar 1988 in Berlin (Apollo-Saal, DDR-Musiktage 1988, Kammerkonzert, Mitglieder des Posaunenquintetts Berlin: Wilfried Helm (Alto Trombone), Ralf Zank (Tenor Trombone), Norman Reichelt (Tenor Trombone), Jörg Lehmann (Bass Trombone))
- Bagatellen und Interludien for Piano (1989) (UA München 2016, Andreas Skouras)
- Piano Quintet (1992/93). UA 28 May 2000 in Leipzig (Gewandhaus, Rolf-Dieter Arens (Piano), Gewandhaus-Quartett: Frank-Michael Erben (Violin), Conrad Suske (Violin), Volker Metz (Viola), Jürnjakob Timm (Violoncello))
- Schneiders Höllenfahrt for four Trombones and Tuba (1993). UA (PosaunenQuintett Berlin)
- Sieben Szenen for Flute, Viola and Guitar (1993)
- Duo for Clarinet and Piano (1994/95)
- Music for Alto Recorder and Piano or Harpsichord (1995). UA (Markus Bartholomé (Alto Recorder), Andreas Skouras (Harpsichord))
- Konzertstück for four Trombones and Tuba (1995/96). UA (PosaunenQuintett Berlin)
- Divertimento for Recorder Ensemble (1997/98)
- Fünf Stücke for Double Bass (1999)
- Sinfonietta for Strings (2002)
- String Quartet No. 2 (2003/06)
- Fünf Miniaturen for Double Bass Solo (2004)
- Quintettino for Recorders (2004).UA (B-Five Recorder Consort)

=== Stage works ===
==== Opera ====
- Karin Lenz. Opera in ten Pictures (1971). Libretto: Erik Neutsch. UA 2 October 1971 Berlin (Deutsche Staatsoper, Heinz Fricke, Direction: Erhard Fischer)

==== Stage/drama music ====
- Ein seltsamer Philosoph und Hauptmann in Zivil / Marek im Westen (1951). Text: Gerhard W. Menzel. UA 11 May 1952 in Berlin (Deutsches Theater Berlin, Direction: Werner Dissel)
- Revue der Einverstandenen. Text: Karl Mickel (published under the Pseudonym Adam Schrank). UA 1958
- Music to Klaus Störtebeker (1959). Text: Kurt Barthel. UA 16 August 1959 Ralswiek (Rügenfestspiele, Direction: Hanns Anselm Perten) – see: Klaus Störtebeker : Dramat. Ballade in 6 Episoden, e. Vorspiel u. e. Nachspiel / Buch: Kuba. Dramat. Einrichtg: Hanns Anselm Perten. Musik Günter Kochan. [Erarbeitg d. Anh. u. Zusammenstellg d. Bildbeil.: Hans-Joachim Theil ] – Online Ausg.: Leipzig; Frankfurt, M. : Dt. Nationalbibliothek, 2013. Online Ressource http://d-nb.info/1035745585
- Music to Vietnam-Diskurs (1967/68). Text: Peter Weiss. UA 20 March 1968 in Frankfurt am Main (Kammerspiele, Direction: Harry Buckwitz)
- Eine Geschichte von Dir. Text: Waldtraut Lewin. UA 24 November 1974 in Rostock (Volkstheater, Direction: Waldtraut Lewin)

=== Vocal music ===
==== Oratorios ====
- Das Friedensfest oder Die Teilhabe. Oratorio for Soprano, Tenor, Bass, two mixed Choirs and Orchestra (1978) based on a poetry by Paul Wiens. UA 23 September 1979 in Berlin (Palast der Republik, Renate Frank-Reinecke (Soprano), Harald Neukirch (Tenor), Hermann Christian Polster (Bass), Rundfunkchor Berlin, Rundfunk-Sinfonieorchester Berlin, Franz-Peter Müller-Sybel)

==== Cantatas ====
- Legende von der Entstehung des Buches Taoteking auf dem Weg des Laotse in die Emigration. Cantata for Choir and Orchestra (1949) based on a poem by Bertolt Brecht. UA August 1949 in Berlin (Jugendchor und -orchester der Rundfunkabteilung Junge Welt, Ferdinand Schmitz, Solist: Gerhard Räker)
- Ernst Thälmann. Cantata for mixed Choir and Orchestra (1949). Text: Max Zimmering. UA 6 February 1960
- Die Welt ist jung. Cantata for Solo Voices, mixed Choir and Orchestra (1951). Text: Paul Wiens. UA Berlin (Weltfestspiele der Jugend)
- Die Asche von Birkenau. Cantata for Alto Solo and Orchestra (1965). Text: Stephan Hermlin. UA 25 April 1966 in Berlin (Berliner Sinfonieorchester, Annelies Burmeister (Alt), Kurt Masur)
- Aurora. Cantata for medium female voice, choir and orchestra (1966). Text: Stephan Hermlin. UA 12 March 1967 in Berlin
- Urbar machen, tätig sein, Mensch sein! Cycle for mixed Choir (1969). Text: Werner Lindemann. UA 13 December 1969 in Stuer (FDGB-Chor Neubrandenburg, Günter Wilsch)
- Wir unaufhaltsam. Symphonic Demonstration for Baritone, Speaker, mixed Choir and Orchestra (1970) based on a text by Jo Schulz. UA 1971 in Riesa (13. Arbeiterfestspiele, Hermann Hähnel (Baritone), Monika Naumann und Werner Hafft (Speaker), Chor des Volkskunstensembles „Joliot-Curie“ des VEB Rohrkombinats Riesa, Chor der Technischen Universität Dresden, Staatliches Sinfonieorchester Riesa, Karl Haffner)
- Das Testament von Ho chi Minh (1970). Cantata for Speaker, Chamber Orchestra and nine Instruments. UA in Rostock (Volkstheater)
- Die Hände der Genossen. Cantata for Baritone and Orchestra (1974) based on texts by Giannis Ritsos. UA 25 February 1975 (Berliner Sinfonieorchester, Werner Haseleu (Baritone), Kurt Sanderling)

==== Melodram ====
- LUTHER. Melodrama for two Speakers, mixed Choir and large Orchestra (1981) based on texts by Johannes R. Becher on the occasion of the 500th anniversary of Martin Luther on 10 November 1983. UA 12/13/14 November 1983 in Rostock (Volkstheater, 3. Philharmonisches Konzert, Uwe Detlef Jessen, Hans-Dieter Neumann (Speaker), Chor des Volkstheaters Rostock, Rostocker Singakademie, Philharmonisches Orchester des Volkstheaters Rostock, Gerd Puls)

==== Sololieder ====
- Neues Dorf. Four Songs for Voices and Piano op. 3 (1952). Text: Franz Fühmann
- 3 Shakespeare-Lieder for Alto and Orchestra (1964)
- Five Songs for medium Voice and Piano (1965/66) based on words by Johannes R. Becher
- Drei Epitaphie for Baritone and Instruments (1975). Text: Ernst Schumacher. UA 28 June 1982 in Berlin (Club der Kulturschaffenden „Johannes R. Becher“, Herman Hähnel (Baritone), 5 Instrumentalists)
- Triptychon for Mezzo Soprano and four Instruments (1991) based on texts by Rosa Luxemburg

==== Youth songs and Mass songs ====
- Daß nimmer auf Erden geschehe .... Text: Günther Deicke (published 1986)
- Der Sommer summt. Text: Johannes R. Becher
- Der Sozialismus lebt. Text: Erich Weinert
- Ein Jahr. Text: Georg Weerth (published 1972)
- Ferienlied eines Unpolitischen. Text: Erich Weinert (published 1965)
- Genosse General
- Her mit dem Friedensvertrag
- In Bamberg, hinter dem Hügel. Text: Paul Wiens
- Laßt euch grüßen, Pioniere. Text: Max Zimmering
- Laßt uns großen Pionieren ...
- Lied der neuen Erde. Text: Johannes R. Becher
- Lied vom Sperber
- Lob des Lebens. Text: Max Zimmering (published 1958)
- Man fühlt sich wieder. Text: Erich Weinert (published 1965)
- Mein Präsident. Text: Erwin Burkert (published 1953)
- Pionierdank an die Partei. Text: Helmut Stöhr
- Rostocker Hafenlied. Text: Erwin Burkert (published 1960)
- Schützt diese Welt. Text: Günther Deicke (published 1966)
- Signale der Jugend. Final Chorus from the Cantata Die Welt ist jung
- Wir lieben unsere Heimat. Text: Susanne Speer (published 1962)
- Wo wir sind, da stehen Millionen. Text: Wilm Weinstock (published 1954)

=== Radio and film ===
==== Radio dramas ====
- Helmbrecht by Barbara Winkler. DDR 1961. Direction: Fritz Göhler.
- Der kluge Alexander by Joachim Kupsch. DDR 1963. Direction: Fritz Göhler.
- Hirsch Heinrich by Fred Rodrian. DDR 1963. Direction: Uwe Haacke.

==== Film music ====
- Sport voran – seid bereit. Short Documentary, DDR 1951.
- Heimat, wir schützen dich. Short Documentary, DDR 1952. Direction: Bruno Kleberg.
- Das kleine und das große Glück. DDR 1953. Direction: Martin Hellberg.
- Einmal ist keinmal. DDR 1954/55. Direction: Konrad Wolf.
- Heimliche Ehen. DDR 1955/56. Direction: Gustav von Wangenheim.
- Bärenburger Schnurre. DDR 1956/57. Direction: Ralf Kirsten.
- Italienisches Capriccio. DDR 1961. Direction: Glauco Pellegrini.
- Die Hochzeit von Länneken. DDR 1963/64. Direction: Heiner Carow.
- Terra Incognita. DDR 1964/65. Direction: Hanns Anselm Perten.
- Die Räuber. TV movie, DDR 1967. Direction: Gerd Keil.
- Jubiläum einer Stadt – 750 Jahre Rostock. Short Documentary, DDR 1968. Direction: Winfried Junge.
- Die Verschworenen. TV movie, DDR 1971. Direction: Martin Eckermann.
- Inselsommer. TV movie, DDR 1973/74. Direction: Martin Eckermann.

=== Folk song arrangements ===
- Deutsche Volkslieder for Voices and Piano op. 11a (1955)
- Deutsche Volkslieder for Voices and Piano op. 11b (1956)
- Deutsche Volkslieder 1. Folge für Sopran and Piano (1956)
- Deutsche Volkslieder 2. Folge für Sopran and Piano (1979). UA 17 April 1984 in Weimar (1. Erfurter Tage Zeitgenössischer Musik, Neue Musik im Saal am Palais, Composer Portrait Günter Kochan, Karin Kurzendörfer (Soprano), Reinhard Wolschina (Piano))
- Es geht ein dunkle Wolk herein for mixed Choir (1979)
- Sieben deutsche Volkslieder for four Trombones and Tuba (1994/95). UA ? (PosaunenQuintett Berlin)

== Literature ==
- Kochan, Günter. In Wilfried W. Bruchhäuser: Komponisten der Gegenwart im Deutschen Komponisten-Interessenverband. Ein Handbuch. 4th edition, Deutscher Komponisten-Interessenverband, Berlin 1995, ISBN 3-55561-410-X, p. 683.
- Dieter Härtwig: Kochan, Günter. In Friedrich Blume (Ed.): Die Musik in Geschichte und Gegenwart (MGG). Vol. 16, Bärenreiter, Kassel 1976, pp. 1007 ff.
- Günter Kochan. In Sigrid Neef (with Hermann Neef): Deutsche Oper im 20. Jahrhundert. DDR 1949–1989. Lang, Berlin 1992, ISBN 3-86032-011-4, pp. 257–260.
- Hans-Joachim Kynaß: Günter Kochan. Verband Deutscher Komponisten und Musikwissenschaftler, Musikinformationszentrum, Berlin 1967.
- Günter Kochan. In Association of Composers and Musicologists of the GDR (ed.): Composers and Musicologists of the German Democratic Republic. Short biographies and lists of works. Verlag Neue Musik, Berlin 1959, pp. 97 ff.
