= Günter Kochan =

German composer (1930–2009)

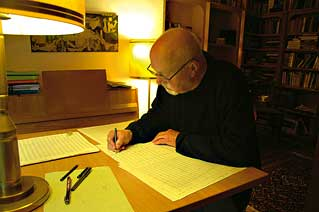

Background information
- Born: October 2, 1930; Luckau, Lower Lusatia, Germany
- Died: February 22, 2009 (aged 78) Neuruppin, Brandenburg, Germany
- Genres: Contemporary classical
- Occupations: Composer; Professor
- Instrument: Piano
- Years active: 1948–2006
- Award: National Prize of the German Democratic Republic (4-time recipient)

Günter Kochan (2 October 1930 – 22 February 2009) was a German composer. He studied with Boris Blacher and was a master student for composition with Hanns Eisler. From 1967 until his retirement in 1991, he worked as professor for musical composition at the Hochschule für Musik "Hanns Eisler". He taught master classes in composition at the Academy of Music and the Academy of Arts, Berlin. He was also secretary of the Music Section of the Academy of Arts from 1972 to 1974 and vice-president of the Association of Composers and Musicologists of the GDR from 1977 to 1982. Kochan is one of eleven laureates to have been awarded the National Prize of the GDR four times. In addition, he received composition prizes in the US and Eastern Europe. He became internationally known in particular for his Symphonies as well as the cantata Die Asche von Birkenau (1965) and his Music for Orchestra No. 2 (1987). His versatile oeuvre included orchestral works, chamber music, choral works, mass songs and film music and is situated between socialist realism and avant-garde.

== Life ==
=== Origin and studies ===
Kochan was born in 1930 into a family of white-collar workers in Luckau, Lower Lusatia. He received his first piano lessons at the age of seven from the local piano teacher Elfriede Sommer. Due to his musical talent, he attended the Musisches Gymnasium in Leipzig from September 1944. His fellow students included his later fellow musicians Saschko Gawriloff, Eberhard Grünenthal, Siegfried Kurz and Siegfried Stöckigt. After the closure of the Musisches Gymnasium in 1945, he moved to the Oberschule Luckau in his hometown.

In 1946, his piano teacher arranged for him to take the entrance examination to the Berlin University of the Arts via the composer and music teacher Siegfried Borris. After passing the examination, he waived the Abitur and began studying music in the main subjects composition with Konrad Friedrich Noetel (student of Paul Hindemith) and Hermann Wunsch (student of Franz Schreker) and piano with Maria Petersen. The most important compositional influence on him to date was his counterpoint teacher Boris Blacher.

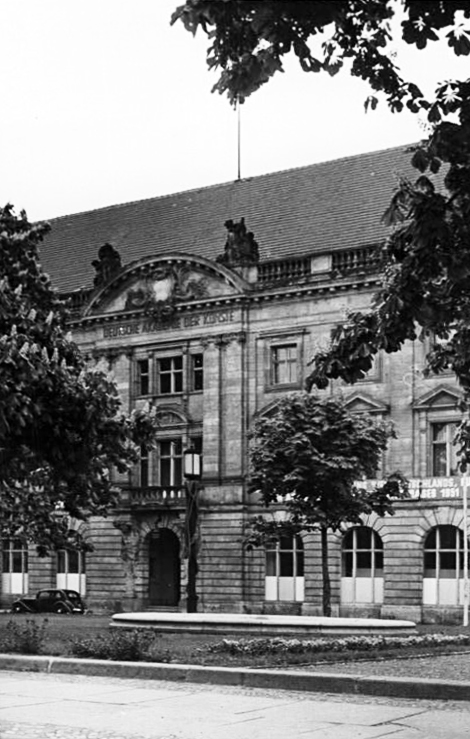
Deutsche Akademie der Künste 1951 in Berlin (East)

Already during his studies he built up networks with left-wing cultural workers who later supported him. From 1948 to 1951 he worked as a freelancer in the editorial department Unser Lied - unser Leben of the Volksmusik department of the Berliner Rundfunk, headed by Jean Kurt Forest. He also directed a Free German Youth choir. During this time, his political views also developed. The composer Andre Asriel, who worked with him in radio, introduced him to Hanns Eisler in 1949. As a student, he set Bertolt Brecht's poem Legend of the Creation of the Book of Taoteking on the Way of Lao-tzu to Emigration to music. After receiving his diploma in 1950, he moved to East Berlin and, as Eisler's second student, began Meisterstudium in composition at the Academy of Arts, Berlin, which he completed in 1953. About Eisler, he later remarked: "He, unlike others, did not want to impose his conception of music on us, but to encourage us in our own development." From 1952 until his death he was married to the pianist Inge Kochan, née Schulze, with whom he had two children.

=== Professional beginnings ===
At the instigation of Rector Georg Knepler, he became a lecturer in composition and musical composition at the Hochschule für Musik "Hanns Eisler" in 1950 (since 1964 Hochschule für Musik "Hanns Eisler"). This made him one of the younger teachers at the conservatoire, which was founded in 1950, along with Andre Asriel, Ruth Zechlin, Werner Scholz and Dieter Zechlin.

Like other up-and-coming composers, he was put under considerable pressure by the cultural policy of the GDR in the course of the Formalism-realism debate in 1951, to distance himself from the Western decadent art establishment This circumstance delayed his own development as a composer. He began his career as a composer with the Violin Concerto op. 1 (1952), which received extraordinary praise from musicologists such as Georg Knepler and Eberhard Rebling as well as the Soviet composer Anatoly Novikov. In 1952, together with the music editor Karl Laux Representative of the Society for German-Soviet Friendship at the Polish Music Festival in Warsaw. In 1953 he was part of an official friendship delegation of GDR artists to the Soviet Union. In the same year, the convinced communist joined the Socialist Unity Party of Germany. From 1955 to 1963 he was a candidate for the Central Council of the FDJ. During the 1950s he wrote quite a few youth and mass songs dedicated to, among other things, the World Festival of Youth and Students. His Signale der Jugend (1951) became an important part of the FDJ's song repertoire.

After the suppression of the Hungarian Revolution of 1956 and the lessons learned from the 20th Congress of the Communist Party of the Soviet Union, he briefly thought of leaving the GDR for the West, but was then changed his mind by cultural officials Georg Knepler and Nathan Notowicz. He initially adapted himself to the Bitterfelder Weg adopted in 1959. In 1971, for example, he still saw the music of the composer Paul-Heinz Dittrich of the same age as the "class enemy". In 1961, he was proposed by the Department of Culture of the Central Committee of the SED for admission to the Music Section of the German Academy of the Arts, but this was prevented by the composer Paul Dessau. In the same year Kochan undertook a study trip to Cuba and in 1962 became a member of the Friendship Committee GDR-Japan of the World Festival of Youth and Students. At the invitation of the Soviet Composers' Union, he travelled to Moscow in 1964 with the composer Ernst Hermann Meyer. On his cultural-political ambitions Kochan later said: "Despite all the difficulties, I always went my way, not out of egotistical intentions to succeed, but to make my specific contribution as a composer, comrade and citizen."

In retrospect, he criticised his work as a film composer for DEFA in the 1950s and 1960s in an interview: "I had written film scores for DEFA - horrible. I still regret today that I let myself be talked into it. But they were well-paid offers. As a young composer, you want to try your hand in many areas."

=== Professor in Berlin ===
From the mid-1960s onwards, he tried to mediate between the old and new generation of composers. In 1967, he was appointed professor at the Hanns Eisler Academy of Music. From 1968, he led a master class for composition at the Deutsche Akademie der Künste. In 1972, he also took over a master class at the Berlin Musikhochschule. In 1973, he received a full professorship in Berlin through the support of Ernst Hermann Meyer, who considered him "the most gifted composer of the middle and younger generations." He was also a frequent lecturer at the Gera Summer Courses for Contemporary Music, founded in 1974 Among his best-known students today were the composers Udo Zimmermann, Lothar Voigtländer and Friedrich Schenker. As a composition teacher, he wanted, according to his own statements, "never to impose my conception of music, but to encourage developments". Kochan worked as a lecturer from 1985 and became emeritus after the fall of communism in 1991.

Kochan received the National Prize of the GDR four times, returning the last one, and was a full member of the Academy of Arts, Berlin (from 1972 Academy of the Arts of the German Democratic Republic; from 1990, Academy of the Arts of Berlin) from 1965 to 1992. There, he served as secretary of the Music Section from 1972 to 1974, succeeding Kurt Schwaen. In 1972, he met with other cultural officials his musical idol Shostakovich, who was visiting Berlin. In addition, he was active in the central and district boards of the Berlin Composers' Association. From 1977 to 1982, he was vice-president of the Association of Composers and Musicologists of the GDR under its president Ernst Hermann Meyer.

After his first two symphonies and several vocal works, he ventured into opera Karin Lenz in 1971, the premiere of which was realised under the conductor Heinz Fricke and the director Erhard Fischer at the Staatsoper Unter den Linden in Berlin. For the 30th anniversary of the GDR, he composed the political oratorio Das Friedensfest oder Die Teilhabe (1979). In a 1979 interview with the musicologist Ursula Stürzbecher, he said: The problems of composing, the question, in other words, of how to compose, are similar all over the world. It is not a geographical problem, but a question of ideological location.

=== After reunification ===
Kochan supported an open letter from composers to the Composers' Association in November 1989, which self-critically reflected on the organisation's recent work. In the opening words it was stated: The composers' association has reacted [...] late, hesitantly and tactfully to socio-political challenges in recent years. As a consequence, those involved called for the resignation of the line-loyal chairman Wolfgang Lesser.

The Berliner Sinfonie-Orchester was considered his house orchestra, which posthumously premiered his Sixth Symphony, completed from 2003 to 2006, in 2011 under the present name Konzerthausorchester Berlin. Kochan's works, however, were hardly ever performed after German unification, Only his chamber music works found a hearing. Since 1992, he lived in seclusion in Hohen Neuendorf near Berlin.

Kochan died of a lung condition in 2009 at the Ruppiner Klinikum at the age of 78. Part of his estate is now in the Archive for Contemporary Composers of the Sächsische Landesbibliothek – Staats- und Universitätsbibliothek Dresden.

== Importance ==
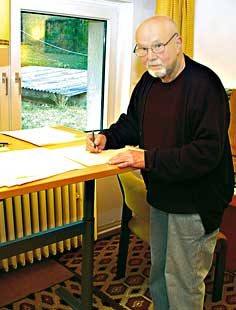
Günter Kochan

Kochan's orchestral works were premiered by the leading symphony orchestras of the GDR such as the Sächsische Staatskapelle Dresden and the Staatskapelle Berlin, the MDR Sinfonieorchester, the Rundfunk-Sinfonieorchester Berlin and the Berlin Symphony Orchestra. He worked with renowned conductors, including Claus Peter Flor, Herbert Kegel, Kurt Masur and Kurt Sanderling.

Alongside Siegfried Matthus, he was one of the most frequently performed composers in the GDR. For example, at the most important festival for contemporary music in the GDR, the MaerzMusik, from 1967 to 1989, no composer was presented more often than Günter Kochan. His works were not only performed in the so-called Eastern Bloc (in Cuba, Poland, Czechoslovakia and the Soviet Union), but also in other Western European countries, including the Federal Republic of Germany, Austria, Scandinavia, Japan, the United States and the United Kingdom. According to Kochan's statements from the 1970s, his Violin Concerto was played about 40 times, his Second Symphony about 25 times, and the Ashes of Birkenau was broadcast by a total of seven radio stations.

According to the Berlin music journalist Stefan Amzoll, Kochan advanced "since the 1970s among the first German composers of his generation". The Dresden-born musicologist Friedbert Streller counted him - as well as authors of music handbooks and feature writers of leading German media - "among the leading composers of the GDR". Die Zeit-feuilletonist Heinz Josef Herbort especially counted his solo concertos as well as his symphonies [...] among the best that the GDR Republic could represent outside The Ashes of Birkenau, in turn, is among the first East German compositions to deal with the Holocaust. Some of his chamber music works were written for renowned performers such as the Gewandhaus Quartet, pianist Dieter Zechlin and recorder player Markus Zahnhausen.

According to the Leipzig musicologist Werner Wolf, Kochan was "never a marketer of his music". Above all, however, his music was considered politically charged after the fall of the Berlin Wall.

== Music ==
Kochan belonged to the middle generation of composers in the GDR, alongside Gerhard Rosenfeld, Siegfried Thiele, Gerhard Tittel, Manfred Schubert, Manfred Grabs, Hans Jürgen Wenzel and Tilo Medek. But like Ruth Zechlin, unlike the aforementioned, he began composing immediately after the end of the war. He followed traditional form models, but also incorporated twelve-tone series technique. In the music scene of the GDR, Kochan therefore occupied a place between Socialist Realism and musical avant-garde.

His first valid composition, the First Violin Concerto, is still very tradition-bound and close to Johannes Brahms. However, Kochan soon developed a quite independent style, which initially emanated from his models Paul Hindemith and Béla Bartók. He composed in a neoclassical, virtuoso style based on a greatly expanded tonality. In contrast, he disliked the strict serial orientation propagated at the Darmstädter Ferienkurses. Not Boulez, Messiaen or Varèse were musically appreciated by Kochan, but the moderate Polish composer Witold Lutosławski, who also received much attention in the GDR.

The Dresden musicologist Dieter Härtwig described Kochan's works as having a "tendency to playful detachment, to cheerfulness and optimism." After a concert at the Warsaw Autumn in 1959, the West German music theorist Diether de la Motte Kochan's music critically with the "Polish School":

— Catching in [...] Kochan [...] the will to cheerfulness, the endeavour to regale without making special demands on the listener's concentration. These sound games between Bach and Mozart, which only occasionally ventured as far as Hindemith, were called 'cheerful music', 'funny variations' and similar. More interesting is the older generation of Polish composers, who deal with Western European influences

In the 1950s, he became acquainted with the symphonies and string quartets of Shostakovich and Prokofiev, which strongly influenced him. His tonal language subsequently became rougher, gruffer and more intense. Kochan gradually broke away from neoclassicism and increasingly incorporated newer compositional techniques among others dodecaphony. He achieved his mature style with compositions such as the cantata Die Asche von Birkenau (1965) based on a text by Stephan Hermlin, which has Auschwitz as its theme, and the 2nd Symphony (1968). A particular trademark of his vital, powerful and expressive music are gritty, impetuous percussion passages.

His works of the following decades are essentially based on the level of these works, despite the expansion of his compositional techniques with aleatoric or serialism. He could no longer make friends with the consistent departure from tonal reference patterns and neoclassical tendencies of his student Friedrich Schenker. Kochan himself saw his lessons with Hanns Eisler as immensely important. Especially his attitude towards the relationship between music and social criticism was decisively shaped by Eisler. Thus, Kochan never lost sight of the listener; his music should remain comprehensible despite all modernity.

The cultural journalist Erik Buchheister attributed Kochan's music an "appellative character" with humanist traits of a Karl Amadeus Hartmann.

== Students ==
- Meisterschüler (Akademie der Künste): Udo Zimmermann (1968–1970), Nikolai Badinski (1969–1970), Lothar Voigtländer (1970–1973), Jürgen Kies (1981) and Reinhard Wolschina (1982–1984).
- Meisterschüler (Musikhochschule): Wolfgang Stendel (1972–1974), Michael Stöckigt (1973–1979), Frank-Volker Eichhorn (1974–1978) and Karl-Heinz Duschl (1981–1983).
- Other students: Peter Aderhold, Hans Boll, Jürgen Buttkewitz, Gunther Erdmann, Siegmund Goldhammer, Günter Hauk, Helge Jung, Margaret J. Kartomi, Hermann Keller, Peter Langhof, Burkhard Meier, Martin Rosengarten, Friedrich Schenker and Gerhard Tittel.

== Awards ==
- 1950: Kompositionspreis beim Deutschlandtreffen der Jugend in Berlin (together with Andre Asriel für die Friedenskantate der Jugend)
- 1953: Dritter Preis bei den World Festival of Youth and Students in Bucharest, Romania (for his Concerto for Violin and Orchestra)
- 1954: Kompositionspreis beim Deutschlandtreffen der Jugend für Frieden und Völkerfreundschaft in Berlin (für In Bamberg, hinter dem Hügel)
- 1955: Dritter Preis bei den Weltfestspielen der Jugend und Studenten in Warschau, Polen (for Gruß an Warschau)
- 1957: Erich Weinert Medaille (art prize of the FDJ)
- 1958: Ernst Zinna Prize der Stadt Berlin
- 1959: National Prize of the German Democratic Republic für Kunst und Literatur, 2. Classe im Kollektiv Störtebeker Festival (together with Kurt Barthel and Hanns Anselm Perten für die Störtebeker-Ballade)
- 1959: Art Prize of the German Democratic Republic
- 1960: Ehrenzeichen des World Federation of Democratic Youth
- 1964: National Prize of the GDR for Art and Literature, 3rd Class
- 1965: Sonnentor über Achat und Amethyst, Composition Prize of the Vereinigung für künstlerische Beziehungen Amerikas (ARCA) in Montevideo, Uruguay
- 1966: Kunstpreis des FDGB for Music
- 1973: Goethe-Preis der Stadt Berlin
- 1974: Patriotic Order of Merit in Silver
- 1975: Art Prize of the FDGB for Music
- 1978: Erster Kompositionspreis beim Third International Tuba-Euphonium Symposium-Workshop of the International Tuba-Euphonium Association (ITEA) an der University of Southern California in Los Angeles, US (for Sieben Miniaturen)
- 1979: Nationalpreis der DDR für Kunst und Literatur, 1. Klasse (In Würdigung seines kompositorischen Schaffens)
- 1982: Art Prize of the Society for German–Soviet Friendship
- 1987: Nationalpreis der DDR für Kunst und Literatur, 1. Klasse (In Würdigung seines kompositorischen Schaffens)

== Publications ==
- Geht in die Betriebe! In Musik und Gesellschaft, 1 (1951), pp. 49–50.
- Diskussion mit Hörern. In Musik und Gesellschaft, 13 (1963), pp. 405–406.
- Mitgestalter der großen Sache. In Musik und Gesellschaft, 19 (1969), pp. 38–39. (Ulrich Dibelius (ed.): Neue Musik im geteilten Deutschland. Volume 2: Dokumente aus den sechziger Jahren. Henschel, Berlin 1995, ISBN 3-89487-224-1, pp. 80–81)
- Nicht die Technik ist das Entscheidende. In Beiträge zur Musikwissenschaft, 4 (1976), pp. 345–346. (Ulrich Dibelius (ED.): Neue Musik im geteilten Deutschland. Volume 3: Dokumente aus den siebziger Jahren. Henschel, Berlin 1997, ISBN 3-89487-248-9, p. 68)

== Recordings ==
- Seven Miniatures for Four Tubas, Jim Self (tuba), Summit Records, 1995.
- Music in the GDR Vol. 1: Music for Orchestra No. 2. Konzerthausorchester Berlin, Kurt Sanderling (cond.). Edel Berlin Classics, 1995.
- Music in the GDR Vol. 2: The Ashes of Birkenau. Annelies Burmeister (contralto), Rundfunk-Sinfonieorchester Berlin, Kurt Masur (cond.), 1967. Edel Berlin Classics, 1995.
- Contemporaries East - Orchestral Works: Concerto for Piano and Orchestra op. 16. Dieter Zechlin (piano), MDR Sinfonieorchester, Herbert Kegel (cond.), 1959; Violin Concerto, Egon Morbitzer (violin), Staatskapelle Berlin, Friedrich Goldmann (cond.), 1982; Symphony No. 5, Berlin Symphony Orchestra, Claus Peter Flor (cond.), 1987; Hastedt, 1997.
- Symphonies: Symphony No. 4. Berlin Symphony Orchestra, Claus Peter Flor (cond.), 1987, Edel Berlin Classics, 2000.
- Music in Germany 1950-2000 - Symphonic Music: Symphony No. 5. Berlin Symphony Orchestra, Claus Peter Flor (cond.). RCA Red Seal/BMG Classics, 2000.
- Music in Germany - Music for Film and Television: Italian Capriccio. Estradenorchester des Deutschlandsenders, Werner Krumbein (cond.). RCA Red Seal/BMG Classics, 2001.
- New Music for Recorder, Vol. 7: Music for alto recorder and harpsichord. Markus Bartholomé (alto recorder), Andreas Skouras (harpsichord). Cadenza/Bayer Records, 2002.
- Music in Germany - solo singing with orchestra: The Ashes of Birkenau. Annelies Burmeister (alto), Rundfunk-Sinfonieorchester Berlin, Wolf-Dieter Hauschild (cond.). 1975; RCA Red Seal/BMG Classics, 2006.
- Musik der Zeit 30 - Werke II: Die Asche von Birkenau. Annelies Burmeister (contralto), Leipzig Radio Symphony Orchestra, Herbert Kegel (cond.), 1975; Sonata for Viola and Piano, Alfred Lipka (viola), Dieter Zechlin (piano), 1988; Concerto for Violin and Orchestra, Günter Glaß (violin), Leipzig Radio Symphony Orchestra, Adolf Fritz Guhl (cond. ), 1976; Music for Orchestra No. 2, Robert-Schumann-Philharmonie Chemnitz, Dieter-Gerhardt Worm (cond.), 1989. Hastedt, 2007.
