= Wilhelm Brückner (luthier) =

German violin maker (1932–2025)

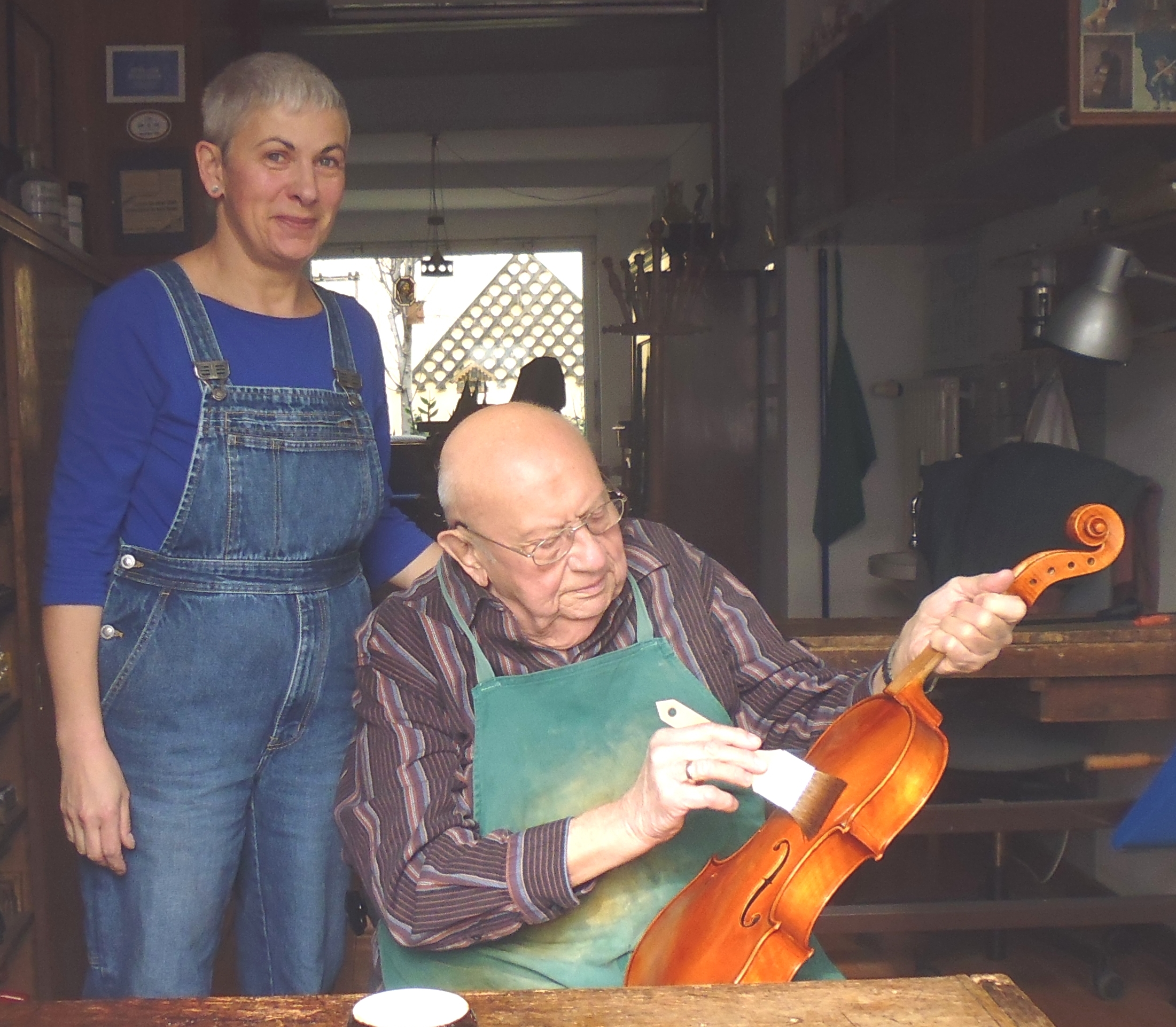
- Brückner with daughter Ruth Brückner in the workshop at age 88
- Born: 30 September 1932; Erfurt, Thuringia, Germany
- Died: 2 January 2025 (aged 92); Erfurt, Thuringia, Germany
- Occupation: Luthier
- Years active: 1960–2022
- Known for: Brücknerbratsche (Brückner viola)

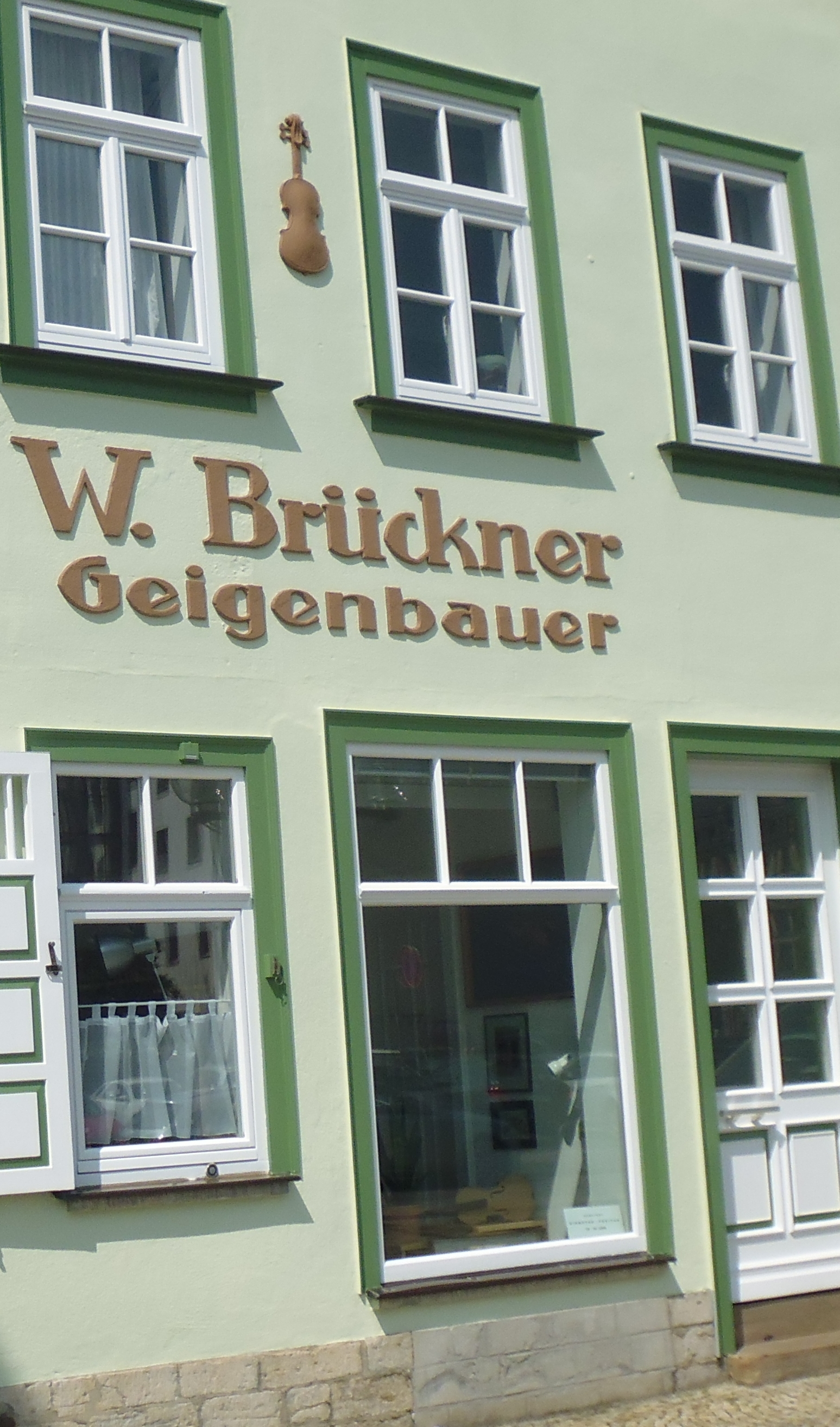
Workshop, in the fifth generation

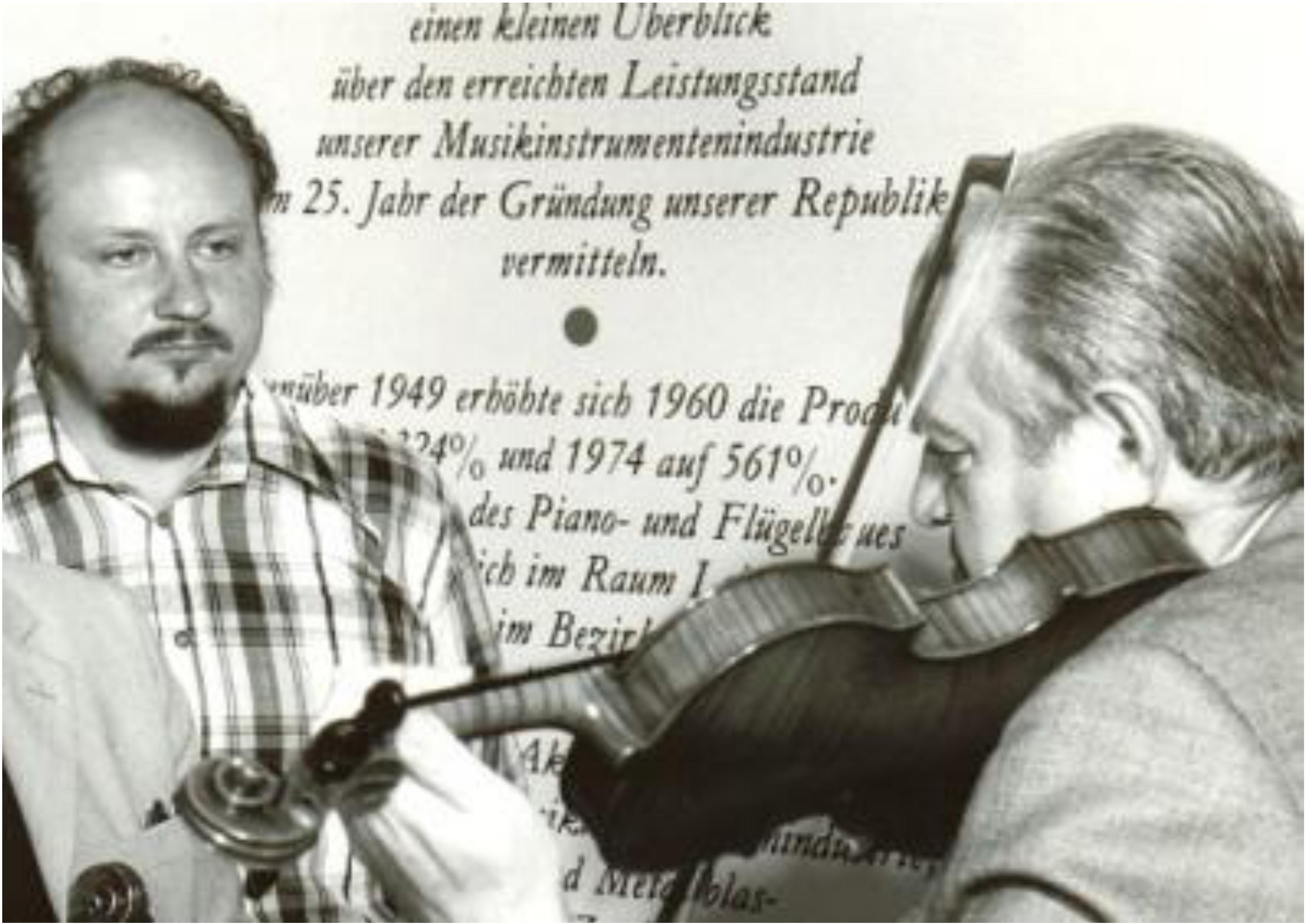
Brückner with David Oistrakh in Erfurt in 1974

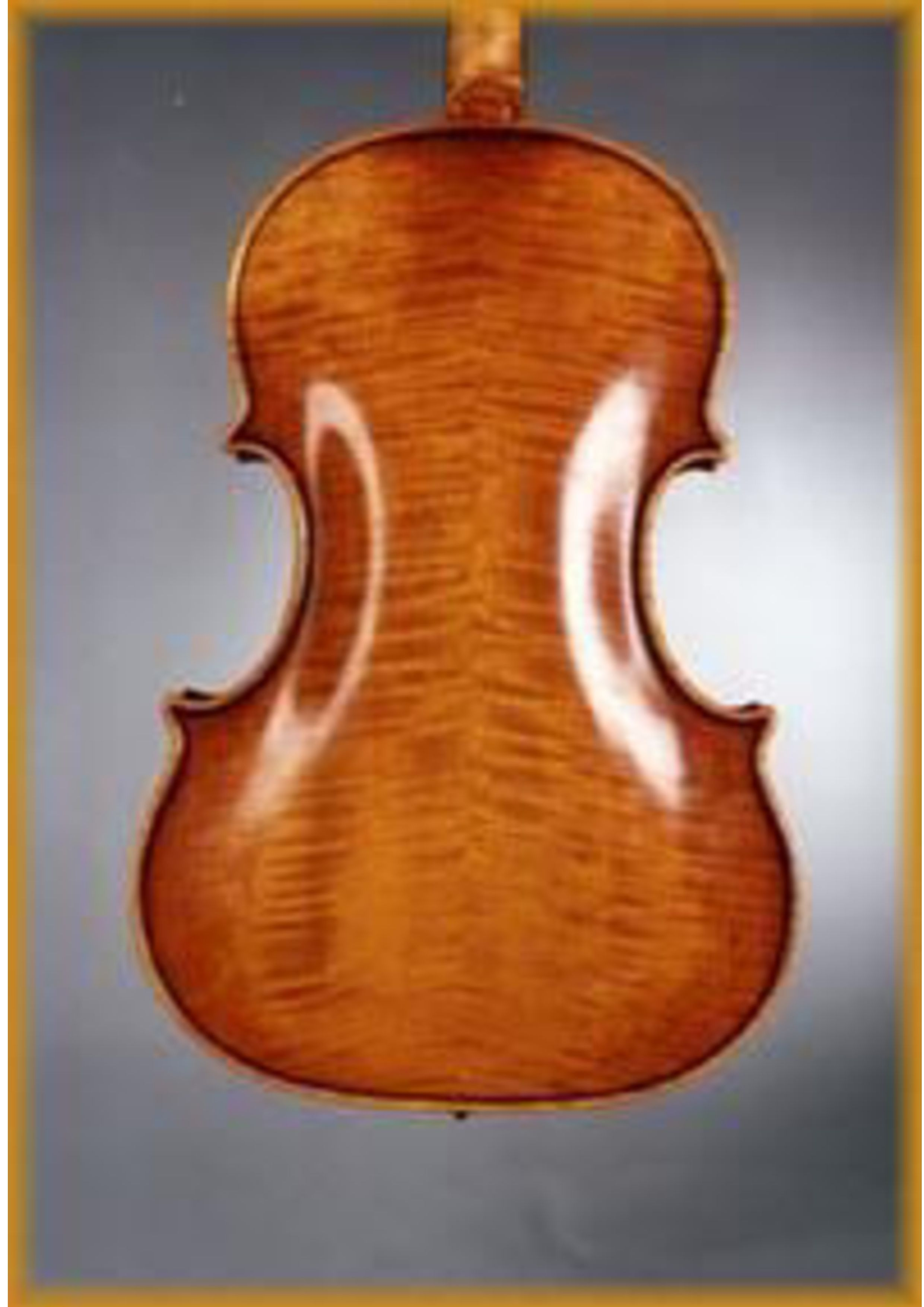
A typical Brückner viola

Wilhelm Brückner (30 September 1932 – 2 January 2025) was a German luthier. His workshop is located in Erfurt, where he developed his own viola model.

== Life and work ==
Wilhelm Brückner was born on 30 September 1932 in Erfurt. In 1960, Wilhelm Brückner took over the violin making company, which had been founded in Erfurt in 1897 by his grandfather of the same name (also Wilhelm Brückner). Before Wilhelm Brückner the Elder (1874 to 1925 – from a traditional Vogtland luthier dynasty) settled in Erfurt, he had received training from the luthiers Giuseppe Fiorini and Alfred Stelzner, on which his descendants (now in the fifth generation) could build.

Wilhelm Brückner received the master craftsman's certificate in 1956. His masterpiece was a viola. The viola building was then also the main focus of his further professional activity. In the following years he developed into an outstanding luthier in the GDR and the Eastern Bloc. In 1972 he won the gold medal in Poland at the most prestigious and oldest violin making competition named after Henryk Wieniawski. In 1979 he was the first luthier to be accepted into the Association of Visual Artists of the GDR, which above all brought easier travel to the West. Despite political difficulties he was able to teach Swedish luthiers and successfully take part in the international violin making competition "Antonius Stradivari" in Cremona in 1982 and in the "Louis Spohr violin making competition" in Kassel in 1983, where he was the most successful participant from the Eastern Bloc with six prizes. In order to solve the serious problems of the still freelance violin makers in the GDR primarily with the procurement of materials, he initiated the establishment of the "specialist group of luthiers of the GDR" in 1978 and became its first deputy chairman. Together with Alfred Lipka, he had started early on to develop his own viola model (the so-called "wide-assed Brückner viola"), which was relatively broad in the lower part and had a sonorous "black" sound, which was then often copied by colleagues and was acquired by numerous internationally renowned soloists. Star conductor Kurt Masur affirmed in a letter in 2005: Wilhelm Brückner's instruments "were always so valuable that they could be compared with old Italians.

Customers were for example: Hans-Christian Bartel, Hatto Beyerle, Oleg Kagan, Alfred Lipka, Tatjana Masurenko, Nils Mönkemeyer, Sophia Reuter, André Rieu, Matthias Sannemüller.

As the oldest active member of the colleagues in the Association of German Luthiers and Bow Makers, Wilhelm Brückner built and repaired in the same workshop as his grandfather, from 1981 together with his daughter, luthier Ruth Brückner (born 1962). On the occasion of his 90th birthday, Brückner announced his retirement from active work. He made 350 instruments (violins, violas, cellos). He died on 2 January 2025 in Erfurt, at the age of 92.

== Awards and exhibitions ==
Source: Menzel p. 17

- 1972 gold medal at the H. Wieniawski International Luthier Competition in Poznan (Poland)
- 1979 Diploma International Triennial Antonio Stradivari Cremona Italy
- 1981 Golden Groblicz at the International Luthier Competition H. Wieniawski for the best artistic design and special prize from the Association of German Violin Makers
- 1982 4th place International Triennial Antonio Stradivari Cremona Italy
- 1983 Most successful participant from the Eastern Bloc with a silver medal and five diplomas at the International Louis Spohr Competition Kassel
- Decoration of Honor in Gold for Crafts

Exhibitions in United States (1978 San Diego, 1997 Austin), Italy (1979 Cremona), Great Britain (1995 London), Netherlands (1998 Maastricht), Japan (1974 Tokyo), Poland (1981 Poznan), Canada (1981 Toronto), Austria (1992 Vienna, 2019 Salzburg) as well as in various German cities

== General and cited bibliography ==
- Annel, Ulf: "Brückner & Brückner" in "111 places in and around Erfurt that you have to see" Volume 2, Emons Verlag, 2016, page 42 f. ISBN 978-3-96041-153-6
- Christensen, James: "Dr. Alfred Stelzner: Pioneer in Violin Acoustics" (accessed 7 March 2021)
- Elsner, Anette: Um die Welt mit Erfurter Bratschen (around the world with violas from Erfurt), Thüringer Landeszeitung 19 January 2005
- Emans, Rainmar (Ed.): "The great Erfurt instrument tradition is continued by the Brückner family", p. 436 in the book accompanying the state exhibition "Der Junge Bach", self-published, 2000, ISBN 3-00-006280-7
- Ermrich, Barbara: Fünf auf einen Streich Thüringen Magazin 2020 p. 31
- Frieling, Rudolf Matthias: "Instrumentenbau aus erster Hand", Kulturjournal Mittelthüringen 4/2010 p. 34 ff.
- Hansen, Nicolas: Deutschlandfunk Kultur 12 October 2014 "Family business made in Germany – The world of handicraft: The violin maker in Erfurt" (accessed 7 March 2021)
- Hirsch, Jens: Wilhelm Brückner – Wie die alten Italiener (like the old Italians), TOP Thüringen 4/2012 p. 64 ff.
- Hirsch, Wolfgang: Nur Altmeister Stradivari ist unübertrefflich (Only old master Stradivari is unsurpassable), Thüringer Landeszeitung, 4 February 2006
- Imai, Nobuko: Catalog "1995 International Hindemith Viola Festival Tokyo, London, New York City" London, 1995 p. 32
- König, Grit (dapd) et al. On 29 September 2012: "Life full of violins" Leipziger Volkszeitung, "An Erfurt man built 333 violas for musicians all over the world" Thüringer Allgemeine 29 September 2012
- König, Grit (28 September 2012). "Erfurter Geigenbauer Wilhelm Brückner feiert 80. Geburtstag". nmz – neue musikzeitung (in German).
- Kummer, Birgit: André Rieu spielt erfurtsch (André Rieu plays "sound from Erfurt"), Thüringer Allgemeine 8 January 2005
- Menzel, Ruth: "Five generations of Brückner in musical instrument making", Stadt und Geschichte 1/2012 p. 16 f.
- Mielke, Ursula: Die Bratsche ist des Meisters Welt (viola is masters word), Thüringer Allgemeine 13 July 1996
- Müller, Judith: "Three generations pull different strings", 60plusminus, January 2013 p. 16 f. 60plusminus Thüringen by CALA Verlag GmbH und Co. KG (accessed 7 March 2021)
- Neues Deutschland: "International Award for violin maker from Erfurt" page 4 (accessed 7 March 2021)
- Połczyński, Romuald: "Da Capo 75 lat Międzynarodowych Konkursów im. Henryka Wieniawskiego "Poznan 2011, pp. 214 and 224. ISBN 978-83-60746-92-9 Download the book (PDF files): part 2 (3,51 MB)
- Sethe, Stefan: "A pioneer of arts and crafts turns 80", BK-Report 12/2012 p. 8
- Sethe, Stefan: "VIOLIN MAKING IN THE MIRROR OF THE TIMES: The Brückner family of luthiers has been bringing wood to life for five generations", published by neobooks, 2013 ISBN 978-3-8476-3410-2 Also available as a 50-page illustrated PDF "Festschrift" in: (English version) (accessed 29 June 2021)
- Stasser, Sylvia and Würker, Wolfgang: Erfurt in oblique tones by Paolo-Film produced for ZDF 1991; also broadcast on 3Sat on 5 April 1992:
- Stepanova, Elena: Die Ostfriesen aus Thüringen – Auch in Bayreuth erklingen die Instrumente aus der Erfurter Brückner Werkstatt (The instruments from the Erfurt Brückner workshop can also be heard in Bayreuth, Thüringer Allgemeine, 5 August 2006 p. 4
