= Zechlin =

Zechlin is both a geographical and a family name in Germany.

== Notable people ==
- Dieter Zechlin (1926–2012), German pianist and professor
- Ruth Zechlin (1926–2007), German composer

== Zechlin as a geographical name ==
- Three suburbs of the town of Rheinsberg, Brandenburg (north of Berlin)
  - Dorf Zechlin
  - Flecken Zechlin
  - Zechlinerhütte (summer residence of the geoscientist Alfred Wegener, the "father of" continental drift)
- German name of a town in Pomerania (Poland): see Żychlin.
