= Ernst Schumacher =

Ernst Schumacher may refer to:

- E. F. Schumacher, German-born British statistician and economist
- Ernst Schumacher (theater), German theater expert, theater and literary critic
