= Markus Zahnhausen =

German recorder player and composer

Markus Zahnhausen (12 March 1965 – 17 April 2022) was a German recorder player and composer.

== Life ==
Born in Saarbrücken, Zahnhausen studied at the Richard-Strauss-Konservatorium München with Hermann Elsner. He also learned Slavic studies and musicology at the University of Trier and the Ludwig-Maximilians-Universität München.

In October 2002, he began teaching recorder at the Hochschule für Musik und Theater München. From 2010 to 2012, he held a visiting professorship at the University of Music and Performing Arts Graz. He was a guest lecturer at the Carl Nielsen Academy of Music in Odense, the Royal Danish Academy of Music, the Birmingham Conservatoire, the Grieg Academy of the University of Bergen in Norway, the Folkwang University of the Arts in Essen and the Wichita State University in the United States.

He was active as a performer of ancient and modern recorder music in concerts, radio, television and CD productions as well as festivals and concert series. He performed among others in Russia at the "Moscow Autumn" and the "St. Petersburg Spring", in Great Britain at the "Exhibition of Early Music", as well as in Iceland, Tatarstan and the Urals. He made guest appearances with the Bavarian State Opera Orchestra at the Munich Opera Festival under the direction of conductors Ivor Bolton, Harry Bicket and Joshua Rifkin.

His first String Quartet Still Life was premiered by the Leipzig Gewandhaus Quartet in March 2003. In October 2003 he made his debut in the US and was a guest lecturer at Wichita State University. In 2005 he received a scholarship for a working stay at the "Millay Colony for the Arts" in Austerlitz/New York.

In addition to his musical activities, Zahnhausen worked as a music journalist for Bayerischer Rundfunk, for the Bayerische Akademie der Schönen Künste and for specialist journals. As editor he was responsible for the series "Neue Blockflötenbibliothek" of the Möseler-Verlag in Wolfenbüttel. He was the initiator of new recorder works by the composers Harald Genzmer, Günter Kochan, Walter Mays, Elis Pehkonen, Rodion Shchedrin, Hans Stadlmair, Boris Tishchenko, Atli Heimir Sveinsson, Þorkell Sigurbjörnsson and Ruth Zechlin.

Zahnhausen was an officially licensed amateur radio operator, holding a German class E radio license. His callsign was DO8GZ. Being a professional musician, learning and actively using Morse code (CW) was comparably easy for him and thus became one of his ham radio pastimes.

== Work ==
- Orchestral pieces
  - Recordare for solo recorder and symphony orchestra (2015)
  - Pan erwacht (The Awakening of Pan) for recorder and string orchestra (as cadenza to the Recorder Concerto in C major RV 443 by Antonio Vivaldi) (2006)
  - Bylina for chamber orchestra, piano and timpani (2006)
  - Sviréli – music for string orchestra and four recorders (2001)
- Vocal work
  - Lucet verbo – motet for 1-8stg. mixed choir (2008)
  - Прощание (Abschied) – Three songs after poems by Sergej Jessénin for soprano and violoncello (2006)
  - Et Amor Omnia – Oratorical Scenes for soli, choir, 8 brass, organ and percussion (2003)
  - Nunc est bibendum! – Spectaculum for spoken choir, clarinet and percussion on texts by Seneca the Younger and Horace (1999)
  - Klingende Zeit – seven scenes after haikus by Günther Klinge for baritone, recorder, violoncello and piano (1998)
  - Carmina Romana – Cantata profana after texts of ancient Roman poets (German/Latin) for high voices, recorder and percussion (1997)
- Chamber music
  - Épilogue for saxophone quartet (2013)
  - En passant – scenes for flute, oboe and clarinet (2009/13)
  - Il cieco miracoloso for soprano, recorder and harp (2009)
  - Philippiká for double bass solo (2008)
  - Adesso – Sixty Tones for clarinet solo (2008)
  - Canto sfumato – Tombeau for harpsichord (2007)
  - Stilleben for string quartet (2003)
  - Strophes for bassoon solo (2000)
  - Sakura – Fantasy on a Japanese folk song for violin solo (1999)
  - Klingende Zeit – Seven scenes after haiku by Günther Klinge for baritone, recorder, violoncello and piano (1998)
- Stage music
  - The Dragon – incidental music for the fairy tale comedy of the same name by Evgeny Schwartz for the Düsseldorfer Marionettentheater (2007)
- Recorder pieces
  - The Awakening of Pan for recorder and string orchestra (as cadenza to the recorder concerto in C major RV 443 by Antonio Vivaldi) (2006)
  - IKONA for recorder (alto/soprano) solo (2006)
  - Sviréli – music for string orchestra and four recorders (2001)
  - Horns of Elfland – Fragments in Memory of Benjamin Britten for tenor recorder solo, (1999), Schott-Verlag
  - Klingende Zeit – Seven Scenes after haiku by Günther Klinge for baritone, recorder, violoncello and piano (1998)
  - Russian Sketches – for alto recorder solo (1997), Ostinato-Verlag
  - Lux aeterna for alto recorder solo (1992/94), Möseler-Verlag
  - Lyrische Szenen – Three fantasies for alto recorder solo (1992), Möseler-Verlag
    - Pastoral – Traumspiel (echo of a fantasy by G.Ph.Telemann) – Nostalgic Waltz
  - Yearly Signs for recorder (alto/soprano) solo (1989/91), Möseler-Verlag
    - Spring music – Summer sounds – Autumn music – Winter pictures
  - Musica inquieta – Sonata for alto recorder solo (1990), Doblinger-Verlag
  - Flauto dolce solo – Seven pieces for solo alto recorder (1988/90), Doblinger-Verlag
  - Klangreden – Duets for alto recorder and transverse flute (1986), Doblinger-Verlag
  - Mopswalzer – A musical fun for 4 treble recorders, Ostinato-Verlag

== Awards ==
- Bayerischer Staatspreis Villa Concordia 2002
- Stipendium für einen Arbeitsaufenthalt in der "Millay Colony for the Arts" in Austerlitz/New York 2005
- Rodion Shchedrin Kammermusikpreis 2005
- Musikstipendium der Stadt München 2006
