= Egon Morbitzer =

German violinist

Egon Morbitzer (6 February 1927 – 14 March 1989) was a German violinist who was born in Mrsklesy and died in Berlin.

== Life ==
Born in Mrsklesy near Olomouc, Morbitzer received his first, only sporadic lessons in Olomouc. From 1939 the family lived in Wiener Neustadt, where he now received regular violin lessons from the then director Fritz Heindl. In 1940, he made his debut there with Pierre Rode's A major violin concerto. In 1941, he moved to the University of Music and Performing Arts Vienna, but was dissatisfied with the training there, so in 1943 he came to the Thuringian State Conservatory in Erfurt, where the renowned violin teacher Prof. Walter Hansmann (1875–1963) taught him. Shortly before the end of the war, Morbitzer was called up and wounded in April 1945. From May 1945, he was able to continue and complete his studies in Erfurt.

Among his fellow students in Erfurt was the pianist Dieter Zechlin, who accompanied him in 1946 to a trial audition at the Deutsches Nationaltheater und Staatskapelle Weimar, which was then directed by Hermann Abendroth, who immediately engaged Morbitzer as 1st concertmaster. In 1948, he also became a lecturer at the Hochschule für Musik Franz Liszt, Weimar, which appointed him professor in 1949. At the age of 22, Morbitzer was thus the youngest professor in the GDR.

Finally, from 1951 until his death, he was concertmaster of the Staatskapelle Berlin. In 1953, he also founded the string quartet of the Staatsoper Unter den Linden, which was sponsored by the GDR Ministry of Culture. Other members were Bernd Müller (2nd violin), Alfred Lipka (viola) and Karl-Heinz Schröter (violoncello). The quartet not only played the classical literature, but was also committed to contemporary composers, especially Dmitri Shostakovich.

Through Dieter Zechlin, Morbitzer also met his wife, the composer Ruth Zechlin, in 1951, who dedicated four of her six string quartets to his ensemble.

Morbitzer was one of the best-known violinists in the GDR. He frequently gave guest performances abroad and recorded numerous disks, both as a soloist and with his string quartet.

In 1975, he was made an honorary member of the Tokyo Symphony Orchestra.

He died in Berlin of cancer at the age of 62. After his death, he also became an honorary member of the Staatskapelle.

== Family ==
Morbitzer was married to Christina Morbitzer née Bürgmann, a daughter of the tenor Ferdinand Bürgmann (1904-1987), who made a name for himself in particular in operas by Richard Wagner. Their son Wolfgang Morbitzer (born 7 February 1965 in Berlin) has been the solo percussionist of the Norddeutsche Philharmonie Rostock since August 1988.

== Recordings (selection) ==
- Max Bruch, Violinkonzert g-Moll op. 26; Johan Svendsen, Romanze für Violine und Orchester G-Dur op. 26, with the Staatskapelle Berlin conducted by Franz Konwitschny – Eterna 1961
- Robert Schumann, Violinsonate a-Moll op. 105; Johannes Brahms, Violinsonate G-Dur op. 78, with Dieter Zechlin (piano) – Eterna 1961
- Canzonetta. Berühmte Violinstücke, with Siegfried Stöckigt (piano) – Eterna 1984
