= Burkhard Meier =

German composer

Burkhard Meier (2 July 1943 – 17 January 2001) was a German music educator and composer.

== Life ==
Born in Finow, Meier studied choral conducting at the Hochschule für Musik "Hanns Eisler" in Berlin and music education and German at the University of Greifswald. He received further lessons from Johann Cilenšek, Günter Kochan and Ruth Zechlin. From 1976 to 1979, he studied composition with Wolfgang Hohensee at the "Hanns Eisler" Music Academy. From 1967 he taught music theory and ear training in Greifswald and was appointed professor in 1989. In 1990, he became director of the Institute for Musicology and Music Education at the University of Greifswald. From 1997, he was professor of school-practical piano playing, Tonsatz and music composition at the Rostock University of Music and Theatre.

He was a co-founder of the Mecklenburg-Vorpommern regional association of the Deutscher Komponistenverband and its chairman from 1996 to 2000.

Meier died in Greifswald at the age of 67.

== Awards ==
- 1984: Hanns Eisler Prize
- 2000: Landeskulturpreis Mecklenburg-Vorpommern

== Works ==
- Die Nachtigall, children opera (after Hans Christian Andersen, 1968, Premiere: 1969)
- Liederzyklus Lob des Sisyphus (1984)
- Kausalitäten für Bläserquintett (1987)
- Musik für Orchester (1987)
