= Mrsklesy =

- Municipality
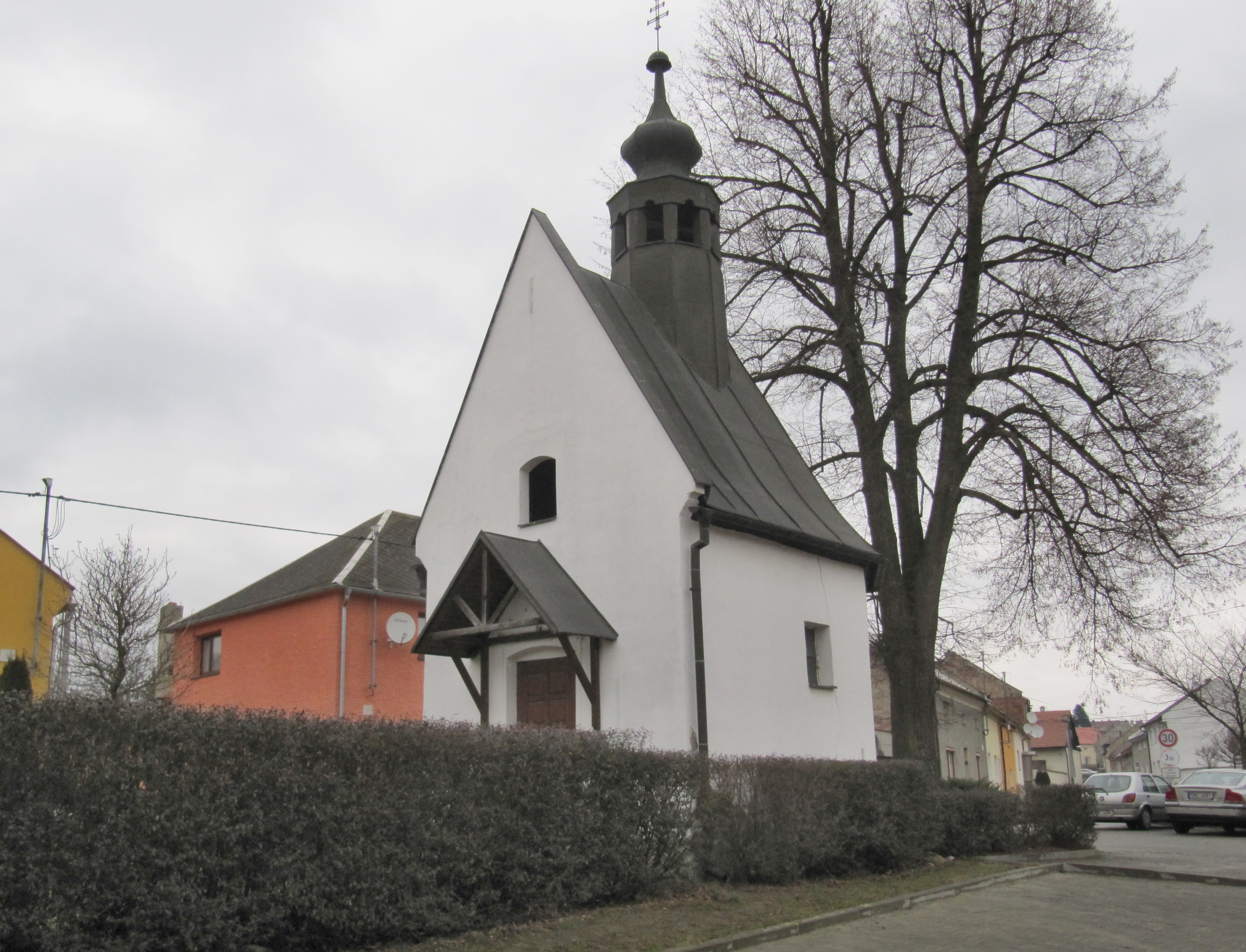
- Chapel of Saint Sebastian

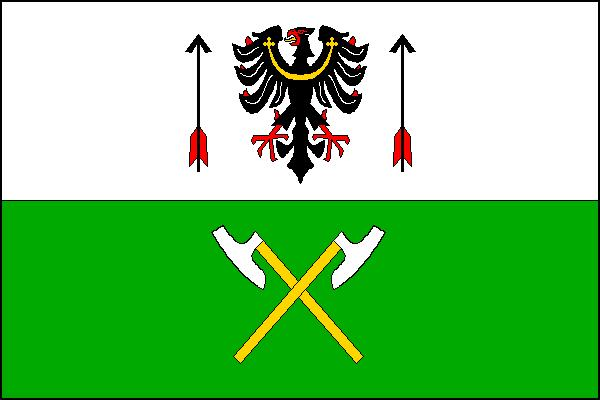
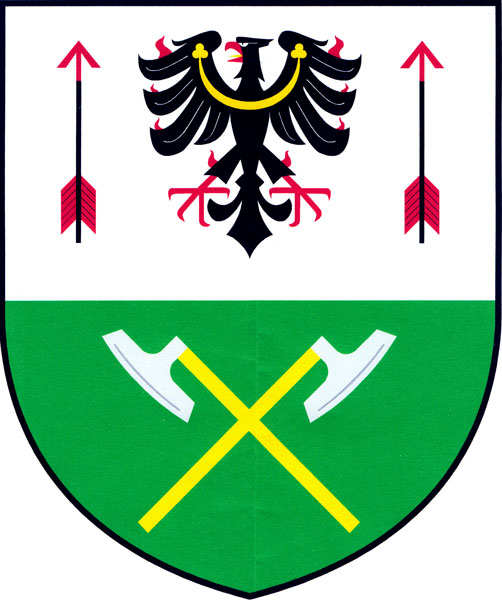
- Flag Coat of arms

- Location in the Czech Republic
- Coordinates: 49°36′9″N 17°24′6″E
- Country: Czech Republic
- Region: Olomouc
- District: Olomouc
- First mentioned: 1364

Area
  - Total: 5.55 km^{2} (2.14 sq mi)
- Elevation: 290 m (950 ft)

Population (2026-01-01)
  - Total: 715
  - Density: 129/km^{2} (334/sq mi)
- Time zone: UTC+1 (CET)
  - Summer (DST): UTC+2 (CEST)
- Postal code: 783 65
- Website: www.mrsklesy.cz

Mrsklesy (German: Nirklowitz) is a municipality and village in Olomouc District in the Olomouc Region of the Czech Republic. It has about 700 inhabitants.

Mrsklesy lies approximately 12 kilometres (7 mi) east of Olomouc and 221 km (137 mi) east of Prague.

== Demographics ==
Historical population
Year	Pop.	±%
1869	448	—
1880	482	+7.6%
1890	537	+11.4%
1900	587	+9.3%
1910	757	+29.0%
1921	746	−1.5%
1930	919	+23.2%
1950	1,045	+13.7%
1961	700	−33.0%
1970	653	−6.7%
1980	539	−17.5%
1991	481	−10.8%
2001	539	+12.1%
2011	556	+3.2%
2021	653	+17.4%
Source: Censuses

== Notable people ==
- Egon Morbitzer (1927–1989), German violinist
