= Frank-Volker Eichhorn =

German composer

Frank-Volker Eichhorn (13 December 1947 – 17 January 1978) was a German composer.

== Life ==
Eichhorn studied mathematics and physics to become a teacher. He also worked as a teacher for two years, but began studying at the Hochschule für Musik "Hanns Eisler" on the side. He eventually gave up his teaching job as a maths and physics teacher and devoted himself entirely to music, becoming a Meisterschüler of Günter Kochan at the Musikhochschule and a teacher of composition there. He founded the concert series Kammerstudio at the Haus des Lehrers in Berlin. In 1975, he was awarded the Hanns Eisler Prize. In 1978, he received a first prize in the chamber music competition of the Dresden Music Festival. His compositions were published by Edition Peters and were performed among others by the orchestra of the Komische Oper Berlin and the MDR Leipzig Radio Symphony Orchestra. In January 1978, he was killed in a car accident at the age of 30. His grave is in the Waldfriedhof Kleinmachnow. His estate is kept in the Saxon State and University Library Dresden.

== Work ==
- Varianten für großes Orchester
- Novelle
- Porträt „Bildnis einer Frau“
- Reflexionen
- Anamorphosen für Flöte, Viola, Kontrabass und Schlagzeug
- Metaphorische Skizzen für Septett
- Doppelkonzert: Novelle
- Fantasie für Violoncello und streicherloses Orchester
- Konturen für Flöte, Oboe und Violine

== Recording ==
- 1979: Varianten für großes Orchester (Nova) with the Leipzig Radio Symphony Orchestra conducted by Jochen Wehner
