= Lothar Voigtländer =

German composer (1943–2026)

- Born: 3 September 1943; Leisnig, Nazi Germany
- Died: 4 July 2026 (aged 82); Berlin, Germany
- Education: University of Music and Theatre Leipzig; Akademie der Künste der DDR
- Occupation: Composer

Lothar Voigtländer (3 September 1943 – 4 July 2026) was a German composer in numerous genres. Before the country's reunification, he worked in East Germany and composed electroacoustic music. He was recognised with awards both in Germany and internationally.

== Life and career ==
Voigtländer was born in Leisnig on 3 September 1943. He received his formative musical education between 1954 and 1962 as a choirboy and later as choir prefect in the Dresdner Kreuzchor under Rudolf Mauersberger. From 1961 to 1968 he studied conducting with Rolf Reuter and music composition with Fritz Geißler at the Leipzig Academy of Music and from 1970 to 1972 as a master student at the Akademie der Künste der DDR with Günter Kochan.

From 1973 Voigtländer worked as a freelance artist in Berlin. In 1984 he founded with Georg Katzer the Society For Electroacoustic Music. In 1992 he received a guest professorship at the University of Paris, was chairman of the Berlin Composers' Association from 1990 to 1996, member of the Federal Executive Board of the German Composers' Association and vice-chairman of the works committee of the Gesellschaft für musikalische Aufführungs- und mechanische Vervielfältigungsrechte. Since 2001 Voigtländer had been an honorary professor for composition at the Hochschule für Musik Carl Maria von Weber in Dresden, and from 2006 to 2016 he was a member of the GEMA supervisory board.

Voigtländer founded several concert series in Berlin, including the "Long Night of Electronic Sounds". Electroacoustic works led him to the studios International Confederation of Electroacoustic Music in Bourges, Zurich, Elektronisches Studio Basel, Hilversum, Freiburg, Budapest and Bratislava. Voigtländer received international prizes, he was awarded several times at the Festival of Electroacoustic Music in Bourges (Grand Prix 1996).

In 2015, he received the Order of Merit of the Federal Republic of Germany.

Voigtländer died in Berlin on 4 July 2026, at the age of 82, after a long illness.

== Work ==
Voigtländer's compositions include stage works, Tanztheater, electro-acoustic sound performances, sound sculptures, space-sound installations, motets and choral songs, solo songs, chamber musics, orchestra and organ pieces.

(mainly published by Edition Peters, Breitkopf & Härtel/Deutscher Verlag für Musik)

- Antike Epigramme for mixed choir, text: Catull, Sulpicia, Ausonius, 1975.
- Drei elektronische Studien for voice and tape, text: Erich Arendt, 1975.
- Orchestermusik I "Memento", Hommage á Shostakovich, 1975.
- Vier Minnelieder des Oswald von Wolkenstein for tenor and orchestra, 1977.
- Einmal Lieder for high voice and piano, texts: Federico García Lorca, Louis Aragon and Friedemann Berger, 1977.
- Am Ende des Regenbogens (choir cycle) 8 songs for mixed choir a cappella after texts by Berger, Kahlau, Morgenstern, Strittmatter, Rive und Ketschua-Lyrik. 1978, Edition Peters 1983
- vergesse...durcheinander...o süße for vocals, 4 trombones, 4 percussions. text: Marc Braet, Erich Fried, Samuel Beckett, E. E. Cummings, (1983, revised with tape 2005).
- Maikäfer flieg, electro-acoustic soundtrack, 1985.
- Litaneia, Motet for baritone and 2 mixed choirs, 1985, rev. 1987.
- Orchestermusik II, 1988.
- II. Sinfonie. Harfen-Sinfonie, 1989.
- Le temps en cause, Kammeroratorium, text: Eugène Guillevic, 1990.
- III. Sinfonie. Orgel-Sinfonie, 1990.
- Trällerlieder, Kinder-Liedsammlung, 1970–1990.
- Adoratio, Motet, text: Thomas v. Aquino, 1994.
- Voici-Feuerklang! for soprano, double bass, 2 percussionists, tape, live electronics, pyrotechnics, Rheinsberg, 1995.
- Guillevic-Recital, Collage for 3 speakers and tape with painting by Dieter Tucholke, Berlin 1996.
- Lichtklang Nr.2, Sound sculpture for the German Reichstag Berlin with the architect Wolfgang Heinrich Fischer, 1999.
- Missa Electroacoustica in 4 parts, electro-acoustic compositions to videos by Veit Lup, steel sculptures by Reinhardt Grimm and choreographies by Iris Sputh, 2002.
- Visages, KammerSzenario (chamber opera) in 8 parts (E. Guillevic) for soprano, 3 narrators, 3 dancers, 3 percussionists, piano trio, trombone, clarinet and electronic space-sound compositions, Rheinsberg 2002.
- glockenfern-glasschärfe-schwarz, dance performance for 3 Chinese singing bowls and tape, 2005.
- Orchestermusik III was immer ein wenig zittert, das ist dann in uns, 2005.

== Radio play music ==
- 1991: Edgar Hilsenrath: Das Märchen vom letzten Gedanken – Regie: Peter Groeger (Hörspiel – SFB/HR)
