= Gerhard Tittel =

German composer and conductor

Gerhard Tittel (born 13 May 1937) is a German composer and conductor.

== Life ==
Born in Vielau), Tittel first worked as a drafter in Zwickau. From 1958 to 1964, he studied violin with Otto Klinge and composition with Günter Kochan at the Hochschule für Musik "Hanns Eisler". In 1966 he became a lecturer and in 1981 a professor for composition and music setting. From 1977 to 1992 he co-founded and directed the Berlin Youth Symphony Orchestra.

== Work ==
- Klaviersuite (1966)
- Musik für Streichorchester (1967)
- Dialoge für Klavier zu 4 Händen (1968)
- Konzert für Klavier und Orchester (1971)
