= Jürnjakob Timm =

German classical cellist

Jürnjakob Timm (born in 1949) is a German cellist and university lecturer. He played for over forty years in the Leipzig Gewandhaus Orchestra and the Gewandhaus Quartet.

== Life and career ==
Born in Neubrandenburg, Timm studied from 1965 to 1970 at the University of Music and Theatre Leipzig and especially violoncello with Friedemann Erben. During his subsequent three-year aspirancy, he won several international competitions.

In 1973 he became first solo cellist in the Leipzig Gewandhaus Orchestra and in the same year a member of the Gewandhaus Quartet. In addition to his work in the orchestra, he also performed as a soloist. He played with various orchestras in Europe, Japan, South America and the USA. Especially during Kurt Masur's time as Gewandhauskapellmeister, he played solo concerts with the Gewandhaus Orchestra. He performed at the Prague Spring International Music Festival, the Schleswig-Holstein Music Festival as well as in Granada and Ann Arbor. In 1993 Timm was appointed solo cellist in the Bayreuth Festival orchestra.

In 1988 Timm was appointed honorary professor at the "Felix Mendelssohn Bartholdy" Academy of Music and Theatre in Leipzig. Since 1986 he has also taught in Japan as a guest lecturer.

In 2014 Timm retired from the Gewandhaus Orchestra and the Gewandhaus Quartet for reasons of age. He is now a member of the Gewandhaus Quartet again as a guest.

== Recordings ==
His extensive discography includes recordings of cello concertos as well as chamber music, for example the concertos of Robert Schumann and Pyotr Tchaikovsky with the Gewandhaus Orchestra, by Eugen d'Albert with the Berlin Symphony Orchestra, Beethoven's Triple Concerto with Peter Rösel, Christian Funke and the Dresden Philharmonic as well as Günter Kochan's 2nd Cello Concerto with the Rundfunk-Sinfonieorchester Berlin, whose premiere he also performed.

Neben 25 Aufnahmen mit dem Gewandhaus-Quartett und Solostücken, wie Bach's Cello Suites, gibt es zahlreiche Titel mit verschiedenen Kammermusik-Besetzungen.

== Family ==
Two of Timm's sons are also musicians. Thomas Timm is the principal violinist of the Second Violin Group of the Berliner Philharmoniker. Andreas Timm works as deputy principal cellist with the Konzerthausorchester Berlin.
