= Sophia Reuter =

German violinist (born 1971)

Sophia Reuter, born in 1971, in Dresden, Germany, comes from a family with a long musical history. Her father was the late Rolf Reuter, a conductor, and her grandfather, the late Fritz Reuter, was a composer. Sophia is a violinist and violist with a varied solo, orchestral, chamber music and pedagogical career.

== Childhood ==
At the age of 5 she began violin lessons with Klaus Hertel at the Leipzig Conservatory. Her other childhood teachers include Peter Tietze in Berlin.

At the age of ten she was the youngest prize winner in the Johann Sebastian Bach Competition in Leipzig, and in 1988 she was first prize winner at the music competition in Weimar. In 1989 she was invited by Yehudi Menuhin to study at the International Menuhin Music Academy in Gstaad, Switzerland where she was a student of Menuhin and Alberto Lysy.

== Career ==
Her career has taken her to major music festivals and prominent performance halls all around the world. She has collaborated with Yehudi Menuhin, Nikita Magaloff, Igor Oistrakh, Jean-Pierre Rampal, Peter Lukas Graf, and many other notable names. As a soloist she has been invited to perform regularly around Europe and South America, and had often performed under the baton of her father.

In 1997, Sophia began her tenure as Professor at the International Menuhin Music Academy, and in this time also performed as a regular member of the Camerata Lysy, the virtuosi ensemble of the Academy. In 1998 and 1999 she was a teacher at the Mozarteum’s summer academy in Salzburg. In 2002 she began teaching at the BJSO Bavarian Music Academy in Hammelburg, Germany, and around this time began two years of study with Alfred Lipka in Berlin.

Sophia is also an experienced recording artist having made recordings and radio productions with Dinemec, EMS, Naxos BR, Südwest Rundfunk and audite records.

As an accomplished orchestral player, Sophia has performed as a regular substitute in the Berlin Philharmonic and the Deutsche Oper Berlin. In 2003-2004 she held the position of Principal Viola in the Hamburg Philharmonic Orchestra, and from 2006-2013 she played as Principal Viola with the Duisburger Philharmonic (Deutsche Oper am Rhein.) She is regularly invited as Principal Viola at the Liceu Opera House in Barcelona, Gewandhaus Orchestra amongst others. Since 2018 she is a member of Staatskapelle Berlin.

Sophia has been a member of the Hamburger String Sextet, the Reuter Trio and Suoni d’arte ensemble. She currently plays with Trio Lirico and the Tharice Virtuosi where she performs with her musician friends, all former students of the International Menuhin Academy.

== Teaching style ==
Sophia Reuter's teaching style is a subtle blend of old-school techniques to improve left and right-hand coordination and newer methods designed to encourage flawless technique and musicianship without judgment and with much positive reinforcement.
