= Karl Laux =

German musicologist (1896–1978)

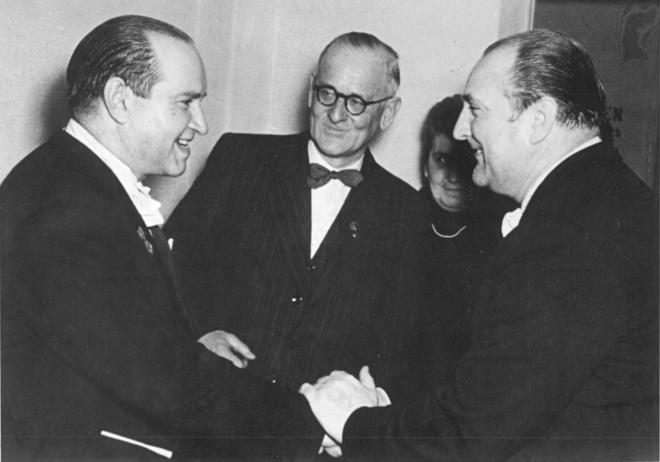
Karl Laux (middle) 1954 after a concert in conversation with David Oistrach (right) and Generalmusikdirektor Franz Konwitschny.

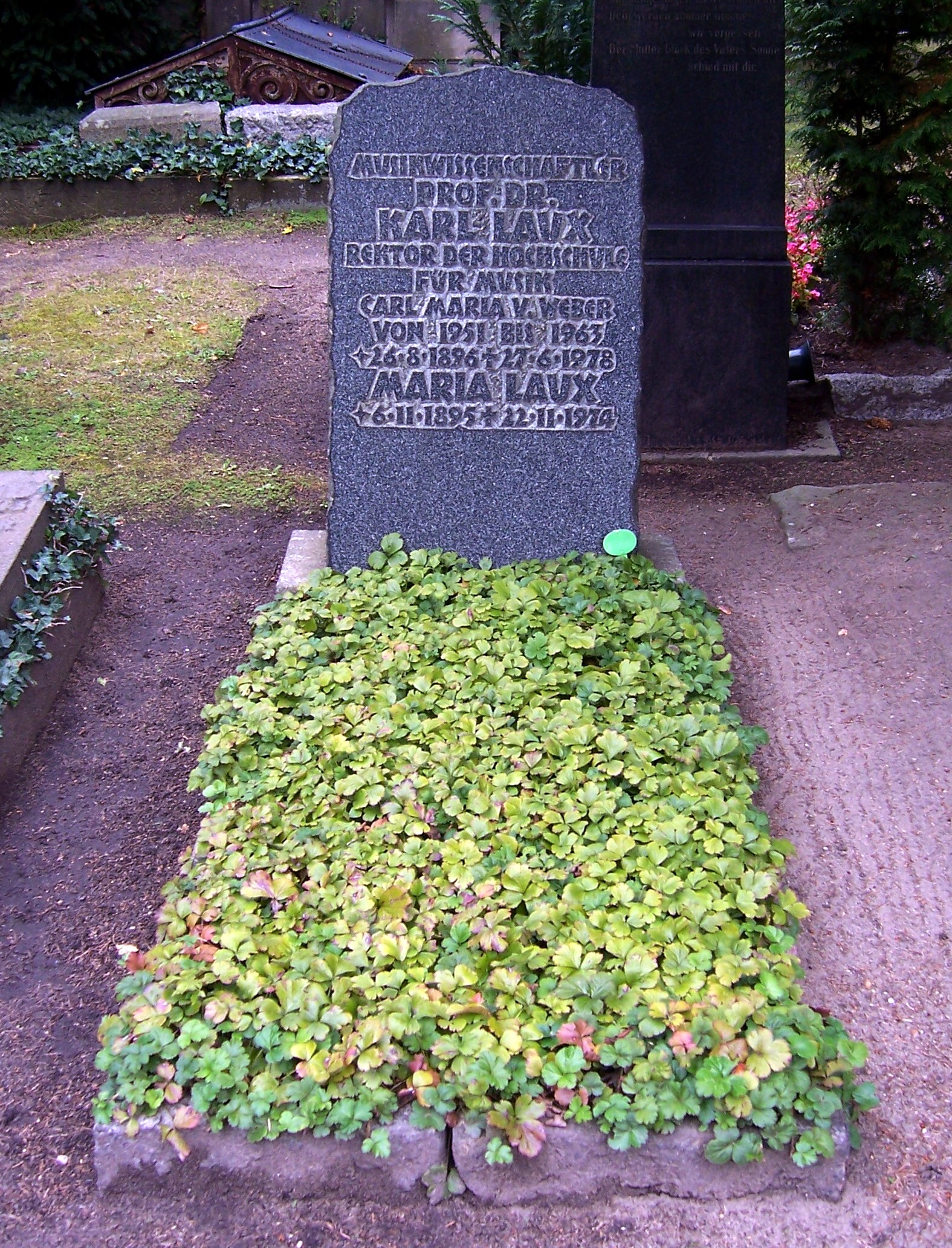
Karl Laux's grave at the Trinitatisfriedhof in Dresden.

Karl Laux (26 August 1896 in Ludwigshafen – 27 June 1978 in Dresden) was a German musicologist, music critic and rector.

== Selected publications ==
- Joseph Haas. Portrait eines Künstlers – Bild einer Zeit. Mainz: Schott 1931.
- Musik und Musiker der Gegenwart, I. volume: Deutschland. Mit 15 Porträtzeichnungen von Kurt Weinhold, Essen: Spael 1949.
- Die Musik in Russland und in der Sowjetunion. Berlin: Henschel 1958.
- Nachklang. Autobiographie. Berlin: Verlag der Nation 1977. (Numerous other publications of books and larger articles by the author are listed in the appendix of the book Nachklang.)
