= Stefan Amzoll =

German musicologist, journalist, and independent author (1943–2019)

- Born: 21 October 1943; Sztum, East Germany
- Died: 23 October 2019; aged 76; Uckerland, Germany
- Occupations: Musicologist, journalist and independent author

Stefan Amzoll (21 October 1943 – 23 October 2019) was a German musicologist, journalist and independent author. In 1989/1990 he was editor-in-chief of Radio DDR 2 and 1990/91 deputy editor-in-chief of Deutschlandsender Culture. A main focus of his work was New Music.

== Life ==
Amzoll was born in Sztum and grew up in the GDR. After a job-related apprenticeship as tool and die maker he attended the Arbeiter-und-Bauern-Fakultät in Freiberg to prepare his university studies. From 1968 to 1972 he studied musicology and theatre studies at the Humboldt University Berlin. After his studies he worked as scientific assistant at the Verband der Komponisten und Musikwissenschaftler der DDR. From the mid-1970s he also published articles in the association journal Musik und Gesellschaft. In 1987/88, now a music editor, he was awarded a Dr. phil. at the Faculty of Social Sciences of the Scientific Council of the Humboldt University of Berlin with the thesis Music in the Radio of the Weimar Republic – Studies on the History of the Origin of Media-Specific Art Production and Mediation. The reviewers of the thesis were Günter Mayer, Gerd Rienäcker and Dieter Boeck. Amzoll was one of those researchers in the GDR who was open-minded about New Music.

In 1977, he began his journalistic career as an editor for the second program of the Rundfunk der DDR (Radio DDR 2). On 1 May 1978 he was awarded the order Banner of Labor in stage II as a member of the journalistic "Collective". From 1979 to December 1989 he was head of the editorial office E- und U-Musik at Radio DDR 2. There he initiated the program "Radio DDR-Musikklub", which was focused on contemporary music. He also designed composer portraits of Georg Katzer, Friedrich Goldmann and Reiner Bredemeyer among others. From December 1989 to June 1990, Amzoll worked as Chief editor of Radio DDR 2. The administrative scientist Susanne Hepperle of the Saarländischer Rundfunk retrospectively described Amzoll as a former "functionary in the SED basic organization of the GDR Broadcasting Corporation".

After the reunification he was provisionally taken over by the new Deutschlandsender Kultur as one of few co-workers. From June 1990 he worked as deputy editor-in-chiefunder the direction of Monika Künzel, until he was "suspended" from service at the end of 1991 by the Broadcasting Commissioner of the newly-formed German states Rudolf Mühlfenzl and the ZDF director Dieter Stolte. The journalist Otto Köhler (1993) found little sympathy for this in a guest article in Die Zeit, since DS Kultur was "above all his [Amzoll's] work" and the music editor "has gotten himself into a lot of trouble with the SED and much admiration from expert colleagues in the West for his program initiatives".

In November 1992, Amzoll was elected for the PDS by the Berlin House of Representatives for the first time in the history of the Rundfunkrat of the Sender Freies Berlin.

Since 1992 Amzoll has worked as a freelance author. Contributions and interviews have been published in specialist journals for new music (MusikTexte, Neue Zeitschrift für Musik, Neue Musikzeitung among others) and the theatre magazine Theater der Zeit as well as the literary magazine neue deutsche literatur. Biographical articles appeared in the music encyclopedias Komponisten der Gegenwart and Die Musik in Geschichte und Gegenwart. In addition, he published in the theory journal UTOPIE kreativ as well as in national daily and weekly newspapers (der Freitag and Neues Deutschland among others). Since the beginning of the 1990s, he has been writing for the feature pages of Junge Welt. Recent radio reports have been published by Deutschlandradio Kultur; for the Deutschlandfunk he designed specialist programs such as "Atelier neuer Musik".

Amzoll died in 2019 at the age of 76 in Uckerland. He was buried at Friedhof Pankow III in Berlin.

== Radio plays ==
- 1973: with Ursula Auschner: Musik in der Funkdramatik. Eine Sendung mit dem Komponisten Tilo Medek (Rundfunk der DDR)
- 1996: Warum haben Sie niemals Stalin angeklagt? – Regie: Karlheinz Liefers (Rundfunk der DDR)
- 1996: Ich bin das Auge. Radio-Szenario about Dziga Vertov – Regie: Wolfgang Rindfleisch (Deutschlandradio)
- 2003: Putze Polina – Regie: Wolfgang Rindfleisch (Deutschlandradio)

== Writings ==
- (ed.): Landschaft "für" Schenker. edition refugium, Berlin 2003, ISBN 3-932153-12-X.
- (ed.): Landschaft für Katzer. Akademie der Künste, Berlin 2005, ISBN 3-88331-083-2.
- with Annette Tietz (ed.): Utopia – Thomas J. Richter. Galerie Pankow, Berlin 2015.
