= Die Asche von Birkenau =

German poem and cantata

Die Asche von Birkenau is a poem by the writer Stephan Hermlin from his cycle Remembrance. It was set to music as a cantata in 1965 by Günter Kochan.

== Poem ==
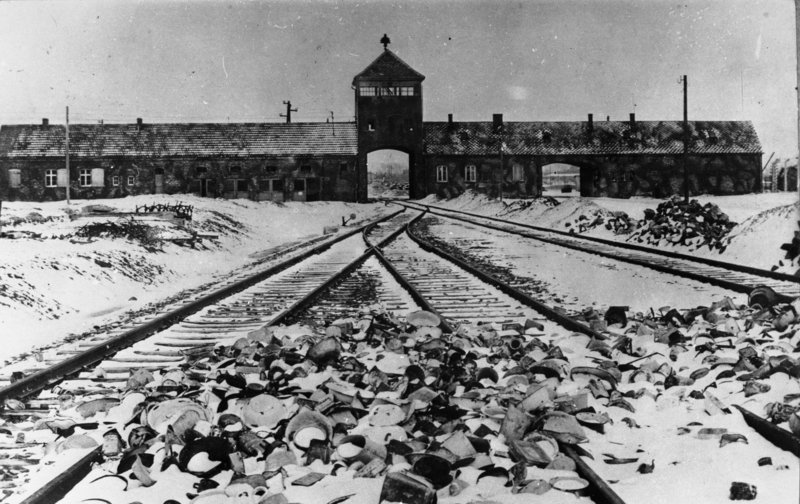
KZ Auschwitz-Birkenau, 1945. Foto vom Torhaus Auschwitz-Birkenau, by Stanisław Mucha

It was written in 1949 during a visit to Auschwitz-Birkenau concentration camp and published in 1951. It is composed of five twelve-line stanzas. Hermlin deals with the Holocaust. The motifs are remembrance and forgetting.

The last stanza of the poem optimistically states:

[...] No murderer will escape,

No fog falls around him. Where he attacks man,

There he will be confronted. [...]

The author expressed himself admonitively at the same time; in a 1979 interview he said:

I believe that this mistake of declaring the past to be overcome is very clearly committed in our country. Unfortunately also by many comrades who say with a certain self-satisfaction that we have overcome the past, those over there have not, they are still in the middle of it, so to speak. Nobody has the right to do that

== Music ==
=== Origin ===
At the time of the still ongoing 2nd Auschwitz Trials, the composer Günter Kochan created The Ashes of Birkenau for alto solo and orchestra (1965). He took his cue from the poem by Stephan Hermlin and divided his work into a total of seven movements, using the 4 stanzas as a basis and composing 3 additional instrumental parts. The key passage is the fourth movement with its Totenklage.

=== Movements ===
1. Andante rubato
2. Interludium I (Andante)
3. Allegro
4. Grave
5. Interlude II: Moderato
6. Vivace
7. Epilogue: Moderato

=== Orchestration ===
soloist voice (alto), 2 flutes, 1 oboe, 2 clarinets, 2 bassoons, 2 horns, 2 trumpets, 1 trombone, 1 timpani, 1 percussion, 1 celesta, 1 piano, strings

=== Premiere ===
The work was premiered on 25 May 1966 by the Berlin Symphony Orchestra conducted by Kurt Masur in Berlin. It has a duration of approximately 16 minutes.

=== Importance ===
Kochan considered the Ashes of Birkenau to be one of his most important pieces. According to his own statements from the 1970s, the work was broadcast by more than seven radio stations. The cantata advanced to become one of the most important musical works dealing with the genocide of the Jews.

=== Recordings ===
- Annelies Burmeister (contralto), Rundfunk-Sinfonieorchester Berlin, conductor: Kurt Masur (1967)
- Annelies Burmeister (contralto), Rundfunk-Sinfonieorchester Berlin, conductor: Wolf-Dieter Hauschild (1975)
- Annelies Burmeister (contralto), Leipzig Radio Symphony Orchestra, conductor: Herbert Kegel (1975)

== Reception ==
The Holocaust survivors Simon Wiesenthal wrote a text on the poem in 1979. In part, it said:

Now I was reading Stephan Hermlin's poem The Ashes of Birkenau. Birkenau came alive again, and I felt the pain and sorrow as if I had been in Birkenau - and yesterday

.

In 2002, the last section of the poem was engraved by the sculptor Ingo Warnke on a revolving stone column near the Appellplatz at the KZ-Außenlager Kaltenkirchen in Springhirsch. The text was worked into the turning stone in a spiral, so that the visitor is invited to circle the surface.
