= Reinhard Wolschina =

German composer (1952–2025)

Reinhard Wolschina (31 August 1952 – 4 May 2025) was a German composer.

== Life and career ==
Born in Leipzig, then GDR, Wolschina attended the Musikgymnasium Schloss Belvedere from 1967. Afterwards he studied composition with Johann Cilenšek and piano with Volkmar Lehmann at the Hochschule für Musik Franz Liszt, Weimar. From 1982 to 1984, he was a master student with Günter Kochan at the Academy of Arts, Berlin.

In 1992, he became professor for composition and music theory in Weimar. There, he was the director of the Studio for Neue Musik. His students included Johannes K. Hildebrandt, Hubert Hoche, Peter Helmut Lang and Thomas Stöß. He has worked among others with Roswitha Trexler and Giora Feidman. Wolschina was a member of the trio "pianOVo".

Wolschina died on 4 May 2025, at the age of 72.

== Awards ==
- 1975/76 and 1976/77 Mendelssohn Scholarship of the Ministry of Culture of the GDR
- 1985 Hanns Eisler Prize of the radio of the GDR.
- 1988 Hanns Eisler Prize of the radio of the GDR.
- 1996 Interpretation Prize of the Johann Wenzel Stamitz Prize of the Künstlergilde Esslingen

== Work ==
=== Orchestra and chamber orchestra (from 8 players) ===
- Sonata for Orchestra (1970) - In memory of Béla Bartók, 18'
- Contrast for String orchestra (1972), 15'
- Concert for oboe, strings and percussion (1974), 14'
- Three dialogues for horn and 15 solo strings (1975), 16', publisher: DVfM/BH
- Canto appassionata for orchestra (1977) - In memory of L. Janáček, 13', publisher: EMV
- Drei novellen for string trio and orchestra (1980), 17', publisher: DVfM
- Four Aphorisms for string orchestra (1981). 10', publisher: DVfM
- Wandlungen - Music for string orchestra (1985), 17', publisher: DVfM
- Klangspiele I for flute and 18 instruments (1987), 17', publisher: DVfM
- Concert for piano and orchestra (1988), 16', publisher: DVfM
- Klangspiele II for viola and 14 instruments (1989), 16', publisher: DVfM
- Klangspiele III for marimba, vibraphone and string orchestra (1990), 11', publisher: DVfM
- Klangspiele IV for 2 pianos 8 hands and 4 percussionists (1993), 18', publisher: DVfM
- Zimra for clarinet, string orchestra, harp, piano and percussion (1995) - for Giora Feidman, 16', publisher: EMV
- Double concert for double bass, marimbaphone, 18 winds and 2 harps (1995), 20', publisher: EMV
- 8 Bagatellenn for 8 instruments (with epilogue for soprano and 8 instruments) - in memoriam Hanns Eisler- (1998), 20', publisher: EMV
- Regenbogenmusik for violoncello and small orchestra (2000), 12', EMV

=== Chamber music ===
==== Solo ====
- Sonata for piano (1971), 10'
- Puccini study for oboe (1977), 3', publisher: DVfM/BH
- Monologue for viola sola (1983), 6', publisher: EMV
- 2 Inventions for oboe (1985), 5', publisher: DVfM/BH
- Waldszenen 1986 for double bass solo (1986), 8 ', publisher: DVfM/BH
- Preludium for horn solo (1987), 4', H.H.-Musikverlag, RW 011
- Eisle Variation for piano (1988), 6', Publisher: VNM
- Choral vision for organ (1991), 7', publisher: Keturi
- Windspiele - 3 Fantasiestücke for guitar (1996), 10', publisher: CHV
- Windspiele for piano (1997), 11', H.H.-Musikverlag, RW 001

==== Duo ====
- Canto appassionata for viola and piano - in memory of L. Janáček (1976), 13', publisher: EMV
- Nocturne for flute and guitar (1985) or basset horn and guitar (1995), 6', publisher: Keturi
- Choral-Mrtamorphosen for organ and piano (1992), 10', publisher: EMV
- Playmobil - 3 little pieces to discover- for 2 bassoons (1994), 8', publisher: EMV
- Duodramma for oboe instruments (baritonob. /Ob.+ EH) and violoncello - in memoriam W. Lutoslawski (1995), 9', publisher: Keturi
- Kandinsky-music for flute instruments (bass flute, flute, piccolo) and piano (1996), 10', publisher: Keturi
- Traumbilder - 10 changes of a thought by Robert Schumann- for violoncello and piano (1999), 15', H.H.-Musikverlag, RW 002
- Traumbilder for alto saxophone and piano (2000), 16', H.H.-Musikverlag, RW 005
- Traumbilder for clarinet and piano (2002), 16', H.H.-Musikverlag, RW 003
- Slapsticks for 2 percussionists and percussion tape (2001), 10', publisher: VNM
- Fourteen Variations ... on the beginning of the soprano aria "Last hour ..." from J. S. Bach's cantata BWV 31 for bass clarinet and violoncello (2OO2), 15', publisher: EMV
- Klangwege for violin and accordion (2003), 10', H.H.-Musikverlag, RW 006
- Impulse for guitar and piano (2005), 7', H.H.-Musikverlag, RW 012
- Regenbogenmusik for violoncello and piano (2011), 12', EMV

==== Trio ====
- pezzo capriccioso per trio (t974), 11', Verlag: DVfM/BH
- Vision-Action for oboe, violoncello and double bass (1982), 10', H.H.-Musikverlag, RW 009
- Fantasy for 3 percussionists (1983), 6', publisher: EMV
- Klangszeichen for violin, guitar and accordion (1987), 9', publisher: PMV
- 7 Inventions for 3 flutes (1992), 15', publisher: Keturi
- Epitaph for J.C. for 2 flutes and harp (2003), 6', H.H.-Musikverlag, RW 007
- Béla Bartók: Three pieces from Mikrokosmos in a transcription for flute(s), oboe(s) and piano (2OO1), 7'

==== Quartet ====
- Cocteau-Reflexionen for 2 pianos for 8 hands (1982), 12', publisher: EMV
- Preludium and variations for string quartet (1984), 11', publisher: DVfM/BH
- Moments of Silence - 5 postludes for JSB for basset horn and string trio (2000), 14', H.H.-Musikverlag, RW 004
- Music for four flutes: I. "Breathing silence", II. "Getting into motion" (2004), 8', H.H.-Musikverlag, RW 010

==== Quintet ====
- 5 Caprichos (after Goya) für Bläserquartett und Schlagzeug (1973), 18', Verlag: DVfM/BH
- 4 Aphorismen for string quartet (1981), 10', Verlag: Keturi
- Seismogram 4 Szenen für Fl., Klar., Vi., Vc und Kontrabass mit 5 Holzblocks und 5 Claves (1994), 16', Verlag: EMV
- Seebilder – Metamorphosen for Bläserquintet (2006), 13', H.H.-Musikverlag, RW 013 (in Vorbereitung)

==== Sextet ====
- Drei Stücke for 6 violas (1984), 10', publisher: EMV
- Perpetuum mobile per JSB - Fantasy on the choral Wie schön leuchtet der Morgenstern for 6 clarinets (2004), 7', publisher: EMV

=== Vocal music ===
- Martial-Epigramme for tenor solo (high bar.), mixed choir, 12 winds, piano and percussion (1981), 15'. Publisher: DVfM
- Vier Lieder for baritone and piano (texts by Eva Strittmatter) (1983), 9', publisher: DVfM/BH
- Kosmisch Zeichen for baritone, string orchestra and percussion (after poems by Hanns Cibulka) (1986), 16', publisher: DVfM
- Aenas-Song for baritone and string quartet or string orchestra (1991), 11', publisher: Keturi

=== Transcriptions ===
- Contrabab Concert in F sharp minor by G. Bottesini (1821-1889) in a new instrumentation for double bass and small orchestra (1979), 22', Publisher: Fr. Hofmeister, Leipzig
- Lemminkäinen Suite op. 22/2 by J. Sibelius (1865-1957) in a transcription for English horn, violoncello and piano (1994), 10', publisher: DVfM Leipzig
- La lugubre gondola by Franz Liszt (1811-1886) for basset horn, harp, marimba, vibraphone and tubular bells (2003), 8', H.H.-Musikverlag, RW 008
- Three pieces from Mikrokosmos by Béla Bartók (1881-1945) in a transcription for flute(s), oboe(s) and piano (2001), 7', private

== Recordings ==
- 2002: Trio 'pianOVo' - In concert
- 2006: Chris Bilobram & Reinhard Wolschina - Soundways
- 2012: Reinhard Wolschina - Portrait
