= Andreas Skouras =

Greek-German pianist and harpsichordist

Andreas Skouras (born 1972 in Thessaloniki) is a Greek-German pianist and harpsichordist.

== Life ==
Skouras attended the Odeon in Thessaloniki and studied at the Hochschule für Musik und Theater München with Hedwig Bilgram, Ketil Haugsand, Franz Massinger and Lars Ulrik Mortensen. As a pianist and harpsichordist, he has performed solo, in song duets and with orchestra] in concert halls and festivals worldwide. He has played with the Ensemble intercontemporain, the ASKO Ensemble and the English Chamber Orchestra, among others. In addition, he has been involved in CD, radio and television productions.

Skouras' repertoire includes baroque, classical and Romantic music pieces. He is also particularly interested in works by Greek composers, for example Khoai by Iannis Xenakis, one of the most demanding pieces for harpsichord. Numerous Neue Musik composers wrote pieces for him, including Dieter Acker, Frank Corcoran, Bertold Hummel, Peter Kiesewetter and Fredrik Schwenk. Skouras taught harpsichord at the Hochschule für Musik und Theater in Munich and gave master classes at the Tbilisi State Conservatoire.

== Awards ==
- 2003: Bayerischer Kunstförderpreis.
- 2007: Stipendium für Musik der Landeshauptstadt München.

== Recordings ==
- 2005: Sonaten und Sonatinen by Joseph Haydn and Fredrik Schwenk (Cavalli)
- 2009: Fragmenta Missarum pro Defunctis by Michael Bastian Weiß (Neos)
- 2016: Complete Works For Piano Solo by Bernd Alois Zimmermann (Neos)
- 2016: Chamber Music For Violin, Piano And Harpsichord by Charles Wuorinen with Anne Skouras (Neos)
- 2016: Ins Offene – Klaviermusik Der Moderne (Neos)
- 2017: Piano Works by Kalevi Aho (Neos)
- 2017: Complete Works For Piano & Harpsichord by Anders Eliasson (Neos)
- 2018: Wolfgang Jacobi 125 – Live @ Megève Festival Savoy Truffle (Neos)
- 2018: Domenico Scarlatti And The Modern Era Of The Harpsichord (Neos)
