= Ernst Schumacher (theater) =

German theatre critic

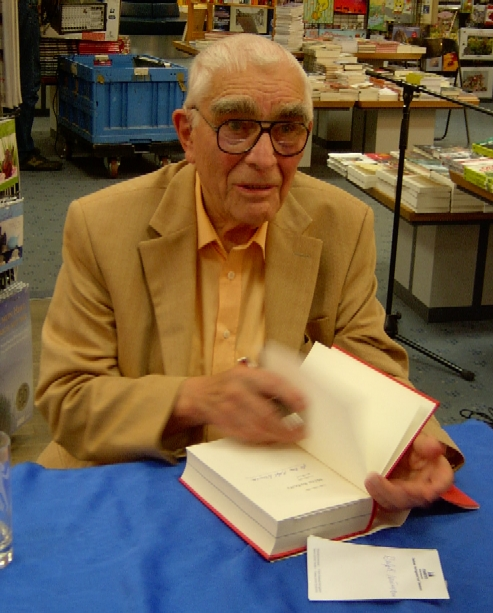
- Ernst Schumacher in September 2006
- Born: 12 September 1921; Urspring, Bavaria
- Died: 7 June 2012 (aged 90); Schwerin, Brandenburg
- Education: Ludwig-Maximilians-Universität München; Leipzig University
- Known for: expertise on the work of B. Brecht
- Awards: Silver, 2nd class 1971 Goethe Prize of the City of Berlin
- Scientific career
- Fields: theater studies, theater criticism and literary criticism
- Workplaces: Institute of Theater Studies, Humboldt University of Berlin
- Doctoral advisor: Hans Mayer
- Doctoral students: Frank Castorf

Ernst Schumacher (12 September 1921, Urspring, Bavaria – 7 June 2012, Schwerin, Brandenburg) was a German theater expert, theater and literary critic.

== Biography ==
Ernst Schumacher was born in Bavaria in a poor peasant family. Thanks to the financial support of his uncle, a priest, in 1940 he graduated from the gymnasium in Kempten and in the same year he was drafted into the army.

In 1943, after being seriously wounded on the Eastern Front, Schumacher was demobilized and entered the Ludwig-Maximilians-Universität München, where he studied germanistics and theater studies.

In the post-war years, Schumacher worked mainly as a journalist in Munich, published the anti-fascist magazine Ende und Anfang (Ende und Anfang); after joining the CPG in 1949 became a Bavarian correspondent East German "Deutsche Radio"; from 1954 to 1962 he was editor of the Munich newspaper "Deutsche Woche" (Die Deutsche Woche).

During the Third Reich, when the name of Bertolt Brecht in Germany remained in the memory of only a few, according to Ilya Fradkin, like some kind of oral legend, Schumacher nevertheless was able to get acquainted with his works of the 20s, and already in his student years, Brecht's work became the main topic of his research. By establishing personal contact with the playwright after his return to Germany and received from him the necessary materials, Schumacher wrote a dissertation on the topic "Dramaturgical Experiences of Bertolt Brecht, 1918-1933" (Die dramatischen Versuche Bertolt Brechts 1918–1933). However, at the Ludwig-Maximilians-Universität München, the topic of the dissertation did not arouse interest, and Schumacher in 1953 defended it at Leipzig University, from Hans Mayer, having received PhD. Published two years later, that dissertation laid the foundation for scientific Brecht studies.

In 1956 the KPD was banned in West Germany, and in 1962 Schumacher, fearing persecution, moved to the GDR. In 1965, he defended his doctoral thesis at Leipzig University on the topic “Drama and History. “The Life of Galileo” by B. Brecht and other plays” (Drama und Geschichte. B. Brechts “Leben des Galilei” und andere Stücke) and since 1966 was a professor at the Institute of Theater Studies at the Humboldt University of Berlin, where he taught performing arts theory. Since 1971, Schumacher was a member of the Academy of Arts of the GDR, President of the National Section of the International Association of Theater Critics, and since 1981 - honorary vice-president of the Association.

== Awards and prizes ==
- National Prize of the GDR in Science and Technology (1986).
- Goethe Prize (1971)
- Lessing Prize (1976)
- Order of Merit to the Fatherland (Vaterländischer Verdienstorden, 1981)

== Compositions ==
- "Theater of time - the time of the theater" (Theater der Zeit — Zeit des Theaters, 1960)
- "The case of Galileo. Drama of Science" (Der Fall Galilei. Das Drama der Wissenschaft, 1964)
- Drama and History. “The Life of Galileo” by B. Brecht and other plays” (Drama und Geschichte. B. Brechts «Leben des Galilei» und andere Stücke, 1965)
- "Brecht. Theater and Society in the 20th Century (1973)
- "Critical articles on Brecht" (Brecht-Kritiken, 1976)
- Brecht's Life in Word and Image (co-authored with Renata Schumacher, 1978)
- "Life of Brecht" (Leben Brechts, 1984)
- "My Brecht. Memoirs 1943-1956" (Mein Brecht. Erinnerungen 1943–56, 2006)
- “The Bavarian communist in divided Germany. Notes by Brecht Researcher and Theater Critic in the GDR 1945-1991" (Ein bayerischer Kommunist im doppelten Deutschland. Aufzeichnungen des Brechtforschers und Theaterkritikers in der DDR 1945–1991, 2007)
- "Who divided Germany?" (Wer hat Deutschland geteilt? 2008)

== Literature ==
- Schumacher, E. (2007). Ein bayerischer Kommunist im doppelten Deutschland. Aufzeichnungen des Brechtforschers und Theaterkritikers in der DDR 1945—1991. München. ISBN 978-3-486-58361-8.
