= Alfred Lipka =

German violist

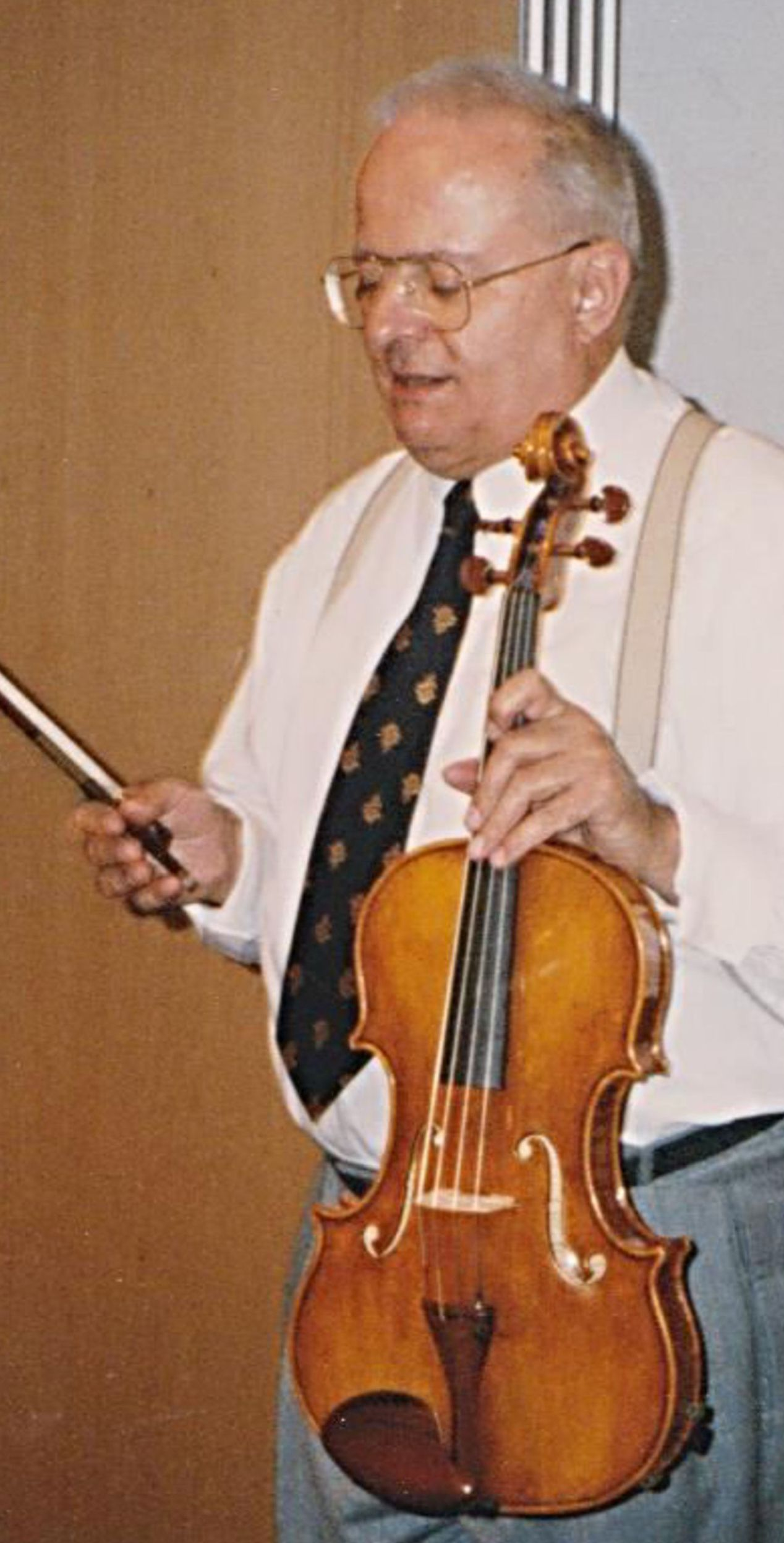
Image of Alfred Lipka

Alfred Lipka (1931 – 12 July 2010) was a German violist.

== Life ==
Born in Schreckenstein near Aussig, Lipka studied violin and viola in Erfurt and at the conservatories of the Hochschule für Musik Franz Liszt, Weimar and the University of Music and Theatre Leipzig. He won prizes at the international viola competitions in Markneukirchen, Budapest and Geneva.

In 1955, he became concertmaster at the Stadtorchester Eisenach and was then principal violist of the MDR Sinfonieorchester from 1958 to 1963. He then moved to the Staatskapelle Berlin as principal violist, where he worked until 1975. In addition, he was for many years a member of the string quartet of the Staatsoper Unter den Linden, together with Egon Morbitzer (1st violin), Bernd Müller (2nd violin) and Karl-Heinz Schröter (violoncello).

From 1975 to 2002, he held a professorship at the Hochschule für Musik "Hanns Eisler".

Lipka performed as a soloist and chamber musician in almost all European countries and in Japan and has conducted international master classes in Germany, Switzerland, Austria, Hungary, Great Britain, Finland and Greece.

He has recorded numerous works for his instrument for the disc, both as a soloist and as a chamber musician. He not only favoured classical works, but was also committed to contemporary compositions.

Lipka died in Berlin at age 79.

== Recordings (selection) ==
- Carl Stamitz, Konzert für Viola und Orchester D-Dur
- Paul Hindemith, Der Schwanendreher; with the MDR Leipzig Radio Symphony Orchestra conducted by Herbert Kegel – Eterna, 1970
