= Dieter Zechlin =

German pianist

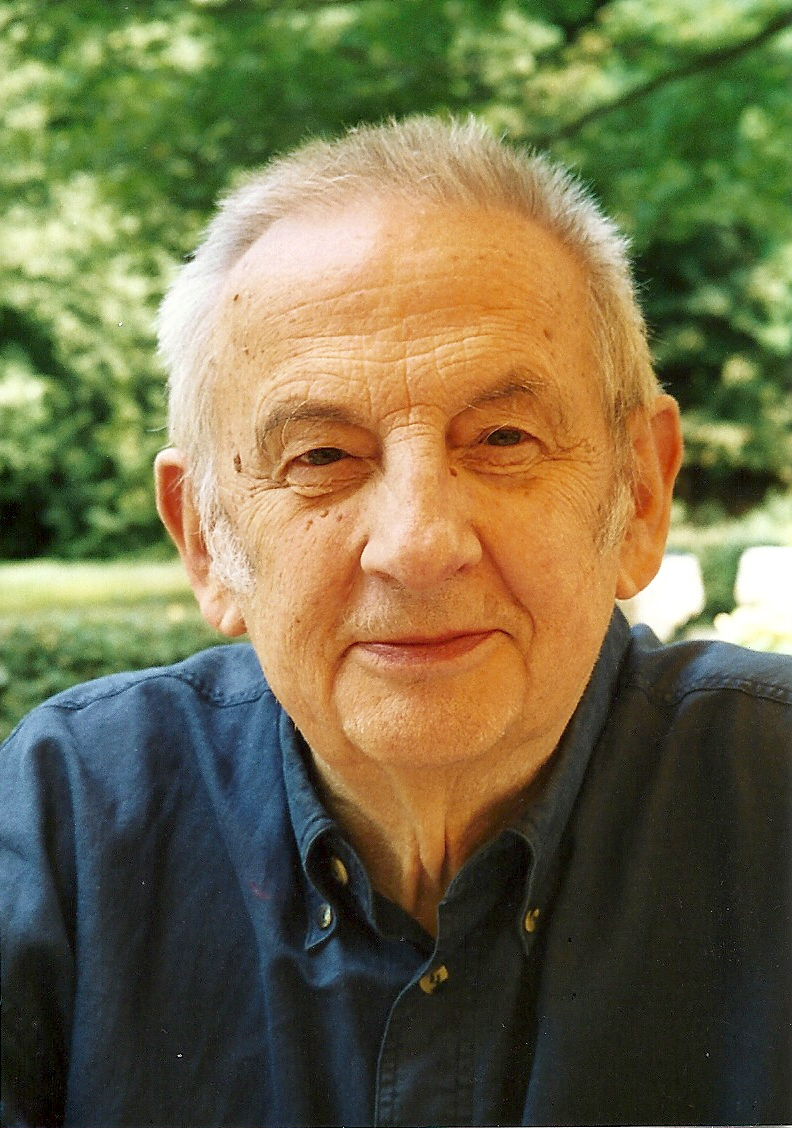
Dieter Zechlin

Dieter Zechlin (30 October 1926 – 16 March 2012) was a German pianist. He was one of East Germany's most prominent pianists throughout the 1950-80s. In 1959 he received the Art Prize of the GDR and in 1961 the National Prize of the GDR.

Zechlin was born in Goslar. He was married to the composer Ruth Zechlin, and was later married to the pianist, Susanne Grützmann. He died, aged 85, in Potsdam.
