= Ruth Zechlin =

German composer (1926–2007)

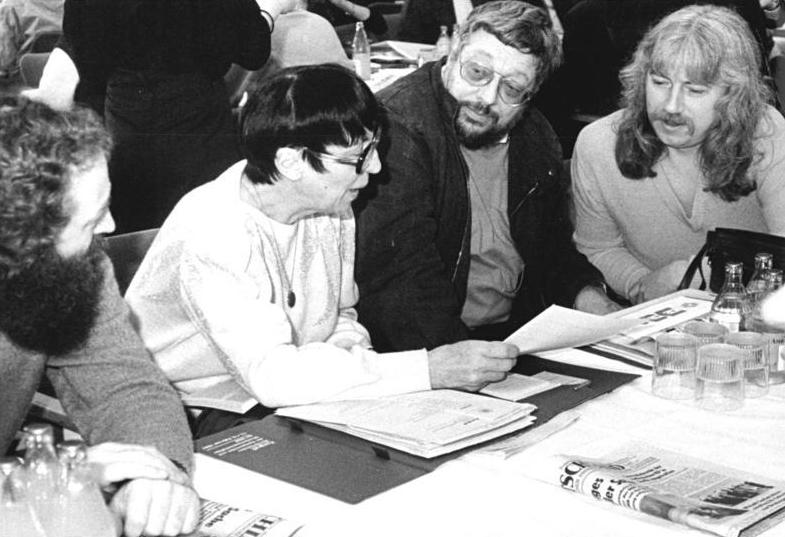
Ruth Zechlin at the composer's Congress in 1987, with (from right to left) Reinhard Lakomy and Reiner Bredemeyer

Ruth Zechlin (22 June 1926 – 4 August 2007) was a German composer.

== Life ==
Ruth Oschatz was born in Grosshartmannsdorf, where she began piano lessons at the age of five years, and wrote her first composition at the age of seven. From 1943 to 1949 she studied music theory with Johann Nepomuk David and Wilhelm Weismann, church music and organ with Karl Straube and Günther Ramin and piano with Rudolf Fischer and Anton Rohden at the Music Academy in Leipzig. After she completed the state exam, she worked at the academy for a year as a lecturer and also worked as a deputy organist at the Nikolai Church in Leipzig.

In 1951 she married pianist Dieter Zechlin, and the marriage lasted until 1972 when the couple divorced. Zechlin gained lectureship in music theory at the German College of Music in Berlin in 1969, where she taught harpsichord and studied harmony, counterpoint, form, orchestration and composition. After 1970 she was professor of composition at the Academy of Arts and taught a master class in composition. After her retirement in 1986, Zechlin continued teaching as a visiting professor. Beginning in 1990, she was a member of the DDR Academy of Arts, Berlin and served as vice president of that organization. From 1997 she was a member of the Free Academy of the Arts of Mannheim, and in 1998 became an honorary member of the German Music Council.

Zechlin composed works for instrumental and vocal performance and stage works, as well as music for radio plays, documentaries and TV movies. She was an active conductor, harpsichordist and organist, and received numerous awards for her work. Her students included Gerd Domhardt, Thomas Böttger and Georg Katzer.

== Death ==
Ruth Zechlin died in Munich in 2007, aged 81, and her estate is owned by the State Library in Berlin.

== Awards ==
- 1955: Silver Medal at the World Festival of Youth and Students in Moscow for the Sonatine for flute and piano
- 1962 Goethe Prize of the City of Berlin
- 1965: Prize of the GDR
- 1968: Hanns Eisler Prize for "Reflections on a piano piece by Prokofiev for piano and chamber ensemble"
- 1968: Critics Award of the City of Berlin for Reineke Fuchs, opera for actors
- 1975: National Prize of East Germany for Organ I
- 1982: National Prize of East Germany for the orchestral works
- 1996 Artist Award of the City of Heidelberg
- 1997: Merit, 1st Class of Merit of the Federal Republic of Germany
- 2001: Bavarian Maximilian Order for Science and Art

== Works ==
- Reineke Fuchs, Opera (1968)
- La Vita, Ballet (1985)
- Die Reise, Chamber Opera (1992, premiered 1998)
- In Memorian Witold Lutosławski for viola solo (1995)
- Music for Orchestra (1980)
- Requiem for G. Domhardt for orchestra (1998)
- Three Songs on Texts of Hildegard of Bingen (chamber music) (1998)
- Violin Concerto (1963)
- Violin Concerto "Hommage á György Kurtág" (1990-1992)
