= Roswitha Trexler =

German operatic soprano and mezzo-soprano (born 1936)

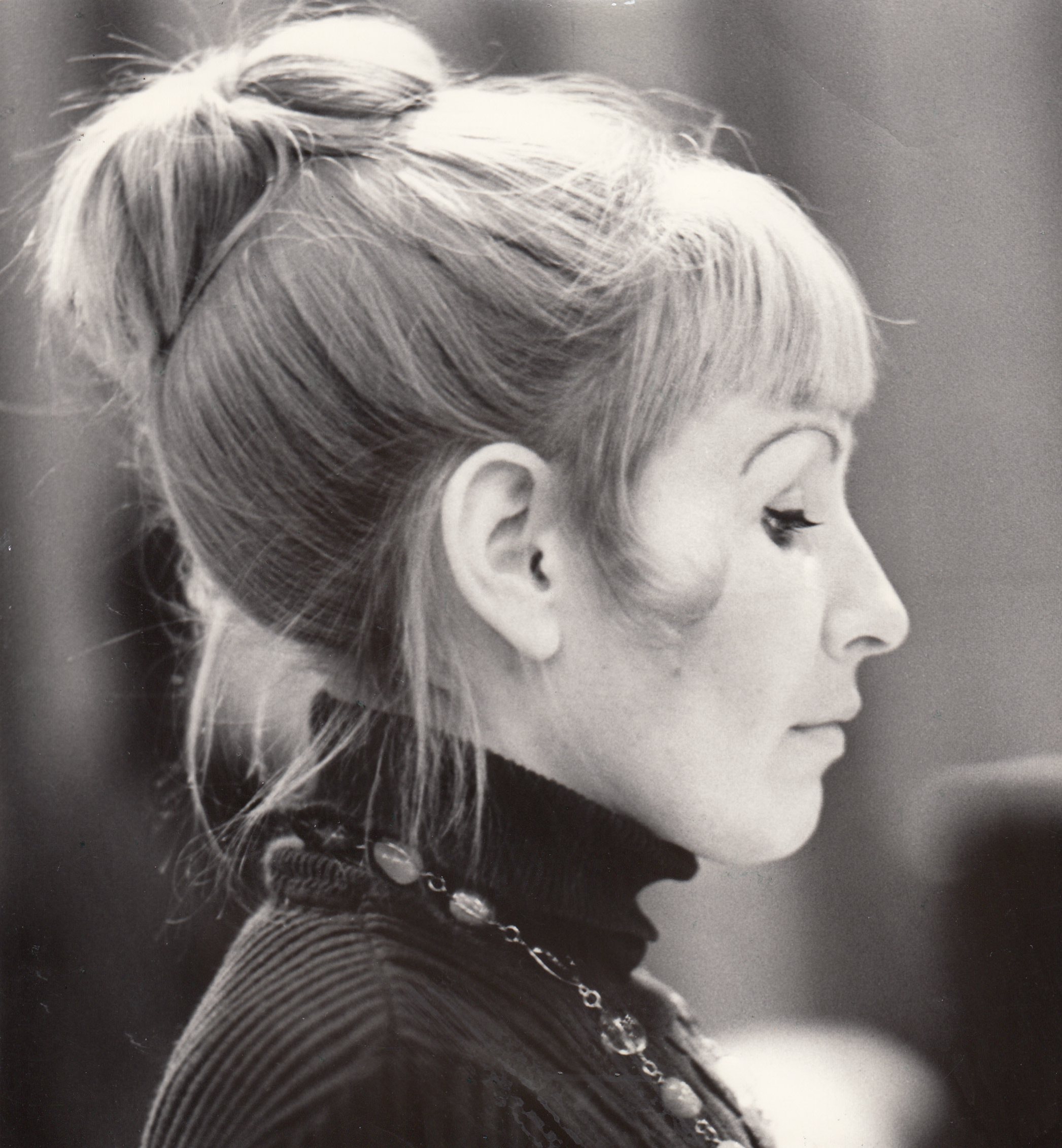
- Trexler in 2013
- Born: November 23, 1936 (age 89); Leipzig, Saxony, Germany
- Occupations: Operatic soprano; Mezzo-soprano
- Awards: See Awards and distinctions

Roswitha Trexler (born 23 November 1936) is a German operatic soprano and mezzo-soprano who became internationally known especially as an interpreter of the music of Hans Eisler and for her commitment to avantgarde vocal music.

== Life and career ==
Trexler was born in 1936 in Leipzig as the daughter of the composer, cantor and professor of catholic church music Georg Trexler. She attended the Thomasschule there and made her debut in 1956 at a festival week with medieval church music. From 1957 she appeared at the Bach performances in Leipzig's Thomaskirche under Thomaskantor Kurt Thomas. For several years she belonged to the MDR Rundfunkchor under Herbert Kegel and was active in special ensembles for early music (Capella lipsiensis, Capella fidicina).

Her career as an interpreter of contemporary music began on 22 May 1969 in a Leipziger Rathauskonzerte by Radio DDR 2 with works by Luigi Dallapiccola under the direction of the composer. In the following years she worked with Hans Werner Henze, Luigi Nono, Witold Lutosławski, Milko Kelemen and Frederic Rzewski on concerts and radio recordings. She also worked for the premiere of works by Reiner Bredemeyer, Paul Dessau, Edison Denisov, Paul-Heinz Dittrich, Georg Katzer, Hermann Keller, Włodzimierz Kotoński, Luca Lombardi, Robert Moran and Friedrich Schenker. One focus of her work was on Hanns Eisler: within the framework of the record edition of the GDR label Nova she was entrusted with the complete recording of his Lieder mit Klavier and the Kantaten aus dem Exil, and in 1982 she premiered his full-length Hollywooder Liederbuch. As Schönberg interpreter she appeared under Kurt Masur with the Pierrot Lunaire and played with John Tilbury (piano) for the label Eterna the song cycle Das Buch der hängenenden Gärten. A side branch of her repertoire was the chanson/song; she has also reflected theoretically on her Kurt Weill interpretations. Her international career started in 1971 at the festival Steirischer Herbst and led her to focal points of New Music like the Warsaw Autumn, the Buffalo-Festival, the Cantiere Internazionale d'Arte Montepulciano, the Centre Georges-Pompidou in Paris and the Musikbiennale in Zagreb.

== Discography ==
- Porträtplatte mit Werken von Paul Dessau, Hanns Eisler, Witold Lutosławski (Wergo, 1975)
- Hanns Eisler: Kantaten aus dem Exil (Nova, 1977)
- Hanns Eisler: Aus dem Hollywooder Liederbuch (Nova, 1978)
- Arnold Schönberg: Das Buch der hängenden Gärten / Alban Berg: Sieben frühe Lieder (Eterna, 1979)
- Paul Dessau: Lieder und Gesänge (Nova,1981)
- Hanns Eisler: Lieder aus dem Exil (Nova 1981)
- Hanns Eisler: Frühe Lieder (Nova, 1983)
- Heiter-satirische Verse (works by Rainer Kunad, Christfried Schmidt, Friedrich Schenker, Hans Jürgen Wenzel) (Nova, 1984)
- Kurt Schwaen: Lieder (Nova, 1984)
- Luca Lombardi: Tui-Gesänge (Eterna, 1985)
- Anton Webern: Lieder (Eterna, 1987)
- Rudolf Wagner-Régeny: Lieder (Nova, 1989)
- Individual contributions, also participation in ensemble pieces, on numerous other records

== TV films ==
- Klaus Ager: La Règle du Jeu (ZDF, 1979)
- Versuche über Roswitha – Roswitha Trexler und die neue Musik (Deutscher Fernsehfunk, 1981)
- Brecht in den Zwanzigern: Brecht als Komponist (Radiotelevisione della Svizzera Italiana, 1983)
- Ich will singend sagen, wie ich die Welt sehe – Porträt von Roswitha Trexler (DEFA-Dokumentarfilm, director Gitta Nickel, 1985)

== Awards and distinctions ==
- 1974 Kunstpreis der Stadt Leipzig.
- 1975 Kunstpreis der DDR.
- 1979 Ehrennadel des Verbandes der Komponisten und Musikwissenschaftler.
- 1984 Stern der Völkerfreundschaft in Silber.
