= Karl Ottomar Treibmann =

German composer and music educator (1936–2017)

Karl Ottomar Treibmann (14 January 1936 – 13 February 2017) was a German composer and music educator. From 1981 until his retirement in 2001, he was professor of music theory and Tonsatz at the Leipzig University. He was one of the representatives of modernity in the German Democratic Republic, whose great major works can be found in the areas of opera, symphony and chamber music.

== Life and work ==
Treibmann, was born in 1936 as the son of an elementary school teacher and a housewife in Raun (Vogtland). He belonged to that generation of composers who experienced the outcome of the Second World War as children. Treibmann lived in his native town (1942–1947) and in Oelsnitz, Vogtland (1947–1954), and in addition to his (grandfather's) lessons, received important impulses from the Oelsnitz cantor and Straube's student Paul Leo.

Afterwards he studied music education (with Richard Petzoldt and Hellmuth Christian Wolff) and German literature (with Theodor Frings, Hermann August Korff and Hans Mayer) at the Philosophical Faculty of the Karl-Marx-Universität Leipzig from 1954 to 1959. In 1959 he passed the Staatsexamen for the teaching profession at the 12-class secondary school. In 1959/60 Treibmann worked as a music teacher at the Polytechnic Secondary School in Zschortau and from 1960 to 1966 at the Friedensoberschule in Delitzsch.

Treibmann wrote his doctoral dissertation in 1966 (in addition to his then teaching activities) at the Philological Faculty about the composer and music educator Helmut Bräutigam. (1914–1942). The reviewers of the work were Paul Willert and Richard Petzoldt. In 1966 he became scientific assistant in the Artistic Practice Department of the Institute of Musicology of the University of Leipzig and in 1969 he became a lecturer for music theory. From 1971 to 1974 he was head of the Artistic Practice Department within the framework of academic self-administration.

From 1967 to 1970 he studied instrumentation with Fritz Geißler and Carlernst Ortwein at the University of Music and Theatre Leipzig and additionally musical composition. During this time, Treibmann realized that his true vocation was to compose. His compositional career took him to Paul Dessau in Berlin in 1974/75, where he began Meisterschüler studies at the Academy of Arts, Berlin.

After receiving the Facultas docendi for the Department of Musicology and Music Education in September 1975, he became university lecturer for music theory and composition at the Department of Musicology and Museum of Musical Instruments of Leipzig University in February 1976. In 1981 he was appointed professor with artistic teaching responsibilities for music theory and composition. From 1981 his professorship was at the Department of Art and Cultural Studies and from 1991 at the Department of Musicology and Musical Instruments Museum of the Faculty of Art, Linguistics and Education. In 1993 he became university lecturer for music education at the Institute for Music Education. He retired from the university service in 2001 when he reached the age limit. His teaching and research areas were music theory, composition, musical analysis and composition in the 20th century.

During his time as a teacher, he was a county music advisor at the department of popular education of the council of the district of Delitzsch. Until 1974 he was a member of the expert commission for music education of the Ministerium für Volksbildung (DDR) and the Ministry for the Higher and Technical Education of the GDR. From 1985 to 1989 he was district chairman of the Verband der Komponisten und Musikwissenschaftler der DDR and from 1990 regional chairman of this body.

Until the end of his life, Treibmann was actively involved in composition. Most of his works were published by Leipzig publishing houses such as Breitkopf & Härtel/Deutscher Verlag für Musik, Ebert Musik Verlag, Hofmeister and Edition Peters. His oeuvre comprises three operas (Der Idiot, Der Preis and Scherz, Satire, Ironie) and seven symphonies as well as chamber music and choral pieces, but also song cycle and instrumental musics. His international breakthrough came in 1973 with the Warsaw Autumn with the 3rd Symphonic Essay. His 5th Symphony was premiered in November 1989 at the Gewandhaus (Leipzig) by the Gewandhausorchester under Kurt Masur. From 1992 to 1994 he wrote motets for the Thomanerchor.

Treibmann died at the age of 81 years in Leipzig.

== Awards ==
- 1981: Kunstpreis der Stadt Leipzig
- 1987: Verdienstmedaille der DDR
- 1988: Art Prize of the German Democratic Republic

== Compositions ==
=== Operas ===
- 1975/78: Der Preis (libretto: Harald Gerlach), one act opera, UA Theater Erfurt, 1 March 1980
- 1983–1985: Scherz, Satire, Ironie und tiefere Bedeutung. Comic opera in 2 acts after the play of the same name by Christian Dietrich Grabbe, UA Städtische Bühnen, 14 March 1987 Erfurt
- 1986/87: Der Idiot (text: Harald Gerlach), Opera (in 7 scenes) after Dostoevsky, UA Gewandhausorchester (Kurt Masur conducting), Opernhaus Leipzig, 1 October 1988 Leipzig

=== Symphonies ===
- 1979: Sinfonie für 15 Streicher (1st Symphony), UA: Collegium Instrumentale Lipsiensis, 25 May 1979 Leipzig
- 1981: Symphony No. 2, UA Elbland Philharmonie Sachsen, 13 May 1982 Pirna
- 1983: Der Frieden (3rd Symphony) (libretto: Volker Braun), UA Gottfried Richter (narrator), Joachim Vogt (tenor), Leipziger Universitätschor, member of the Gewandhausorchesters (Max Pommer conducting), Gewandhaus, 2 December 1984 Leipzig
- 1987: Symphony No. 4, UA MDR Leipzig Radio Symphony Orchestra (conductor: Max Pommer), Gewandhaus, 20 June 1989 Leipzig
- 1988: Symphony No. 5, UA Gewandhausorchester (conductor: Kurt Masur), Gewandhaus, 1989 Leipzig
- 2009: Symphony No. 6
- 2011: Symphony No. 7 (has appeared in print, just like Symphony No. 6)

=== Orchestral music ===
- 1971: Capriccio 71 for Orchestra, UA Staatskapelle Halle, 1974 Halle
- 1973: Konzert für Violine und Orchester, UA György Garay (violin), Rundfunk-Sinfonieorchester Leipzig (Horst Neumann conducting), 1974 Leipzig
- 1982: Hymnus, UA MDR-Sinfonieorchester (Fabio Luisi conducting), 2002 Cologne

=== Chamber music ===
- 1967: Sonate für Violine und Klavier, UA György Garay (violin) and Gerhard Erber (piano), 23 April 1968
- 1970: Streichquartett, UA Mendelssohn-Quartett, 1971 Leipzig
- 1972: III. Sinfonischer Essay, UA Gruppe Neue Musik Hanns Eisler (Max Pommer conductor), 18 February 1973 Leipzig
- 1974: Sonata per Oboe solo, UA Burkhard Glaetzner (oboe), 5 October 1974
- 1979: Unterhaltung zweier Schlagzeuger, UA Gerd Schenker and Günter Pauli (both percussions), 15 June 1979 Leipzig
- 1979: Klavierzyklus II
- 1980: Schlagsonate "Sechs Blätter für Peter Sylvester", UA Gerd Schenker and Günter Pauli (both percussions), 5 October 1980 Leipzig
- 1980: Das Dreiminutenstück, UA Burkhard Glaetzner (oboe), 12 January 1982
- 1982: Blickpunkte für Oboeninstrumente, UA Axel Schmidt (oboe instruments), 19 February 1983
- 1982: Marschschmiede für Posaune solo, UA Friedrich Schenker (trombone), 26 February 1984
- 1985: Consort-Sonate for oboe, viola, double bass and guitar, UA Leipziger Consort, 26 January 1986 Leipzig
- 1995: Schlagkonzert for 6 percussionists, UA Leipziger Schlagzeugensemble, 1995 Graz
- 1996: Consort-Sonate. Version for oboe, bassoon, viola and guitar, UA Ensemble Sortisatio, Alte Handelsbörse, 1996 Leipzig
- 1996: Kommen und Gehen I for oboe, bassoon, viola and guitar, UA Ensemble Sortisatio, 1996 Leipzig
- 2007: Tonspiele for viola solo

=== Choir music ===
- 1992: Losungen I, UA Thomanerchor (Georg Christoph Biller conductor), 2003 Leipzig

== Discography ==
- Komposition Für Flöte Und Orchester / Capriccio 71 / Streichquartett (Nova 1979) with the Rundfunk-Sinfonieorchester Berlin, Max Pommer (conductor), Mendelssohn-Quartett among others // Capriccio 71 / String Quartet (see also Musik in Deutschland 1950–2000 (Orchestra pieces), RCA Red Seal 2007)
- Der Frieden (Nova 1986) with Gottfried Richter (narrator), Joachim Vogt (tenor), Leipzig Gewandhaus Orchestra, Members of the Gewandhausorchester, Max Pommer (conductor) // Der Frieden
- Kompositionen Für Oboe (Free Music Production 1987) with Burkhard Glaetzner (oboe) // Sonata Per Oboe-solo
- Das Leipziger Schlagzeugensemble mit Schlagmusiken (MDR 1995) with the Leipziger Schlagzeugensemble // Entertainment of two percussionists
- Hölderlin – Briefe und Dichtungen (Querstand 1998) with Jürgen Kurth (baritone), Birte Simon (flute), Hendrik Bräunlich (piano) // Hölderlin – Letters and poems
- 4th and 5th Symphony (Querstand 2000) with the Gewandhausorchester, Kurt Masur (conductor), MDR Leipzig Radio Symphony Orchestra, Max Pommer // Symphony Nr. 4, Symphony Nr. 5

== Writings ==
- Helmut Bräutigam. Ein Komponist und Musikerzieher in der ersten Hälfte des 20. Jahrhunderts. Mit umfassendem Werkverzeichnis. Dissertation, Leipzig 1966.
- Strukturen in neuer Musik. Anregungen zum zeitgenössischen Tonsatz. Deutscher Verlag für Musik, Leipzig 1981, ISBN 978-3-370-00001-6 (music textbook; also a Korean edition).

== Literature ==
- Treibmann, Karl Ottomar. In Paul Frank, Wilhelm Altmann, continued by Burchard Bulling, Florian Noetzel, Helmut Rösner: Kurzgefaßtes Tonkünstlerlexikon. Zweiter Teil: Ergänzungen und Erweiterungen seit 1937. Vol. 2: L–Z. Heinrichshofen, 15th edition, Wilhelmshaven 1978, ISBN 3-7959-0087-5, p. 370.
- Karl Ottomar Treibmann. In Sigrid Neef, Hermann Neef: Deutsche Oper im 20. Jahrhundert. DDR 1949–1989. Lang, Berlin 1992, ISBN 3-86032-011-4, p. 468ff.
- Treibmann, Prof. Dr. Karl Ottomar. In Wilfried W. Bruchhäuser: Komponisten der Gegenwart im Deutschen Komponisten-Interessenverband. Ein Handbuch. 4th edition, Deutscher Komponisten-Interessenverband, Berlin 1995, ISBN 3-555-61410-X, p. 1305.
- Ulrike Liedtke: Karl Ottomar Treibmann. In Hanns-Werner Heister, Walter-Wolfgang Sparrer (ed.): Komponisten der Gegenwart (KDG). Edition Text & Kritik, Munich 1996, ISBN 978-3-86916-164-8.

- Karl Ottomar Treibmann, KDG – Komponisten der Gegenwart, in Munzinger-Archiv (Beginning of article freely retrievable)

- Treibmann, Karl Ottomar. In Wilhelm Kosch, Ingrid Bigler-Marschall (ed.): Deutsches Theater-Lexikon: biographisches und bibliographisches Handbuch. Vol. 4: Singer – Tzschoppe. De Gruyter, Berlin among others. 1998, ISBN 3-907820-30-4, S. 2641.
- Treibmann, Karl Ottomar. In Kürschners Deutscher Gelehrten-Kalender 2003 (19th edition), vol. III, Schr–Z. Saur, Munich 2001, p. 3442.
- Ulrike Liedtke: Treibmann, Karl Ottomar. In Stanley Sadie (ed.): Grove Dictionary of Music and Musicians. Volume 19: Tiomkin – Virdung. 2nd edition, Macmillan, London [among others] 2001, ISBN 0-333-60800-3, p. 713.

- Ulrike Liedtke: Treibmann, Karl Ottomar. In Grove Music Online (English; subscription required).

- Ulrike Liedtke: Karl Ottomar Treibmann. Klangwanderungen. Klaus-Jürgen Kamprad publishing house, Altenburg 2004, ISBN 3-930550-32-6.
- Treibmann, Karl Ottomar. In Peter Hollfelder: Klaviermusik. Internationales chronologisches Lexikon. Geschichte – Komponisten – Werke – Literatur. Supplement, Noetzel, Wilhelmshaven 2005, ISBN 3-7959-0855-8, p. 222.
- Ulrike Liedtke: Treibmann, Karl Ottomar. In Ludwig Finscher (ed.): Die Musik in Geschichte und Gegenwart. Second edition, personal section, volume 16 (Strata – Villoteau). Bärenreiter/Metzler, Kassel among others 2006, ISBN 3-7618-1136-5, pp. 1023–1025 ([subscription required for full access) Online-edition], subscription required for full access).
- Werner Wolf: Vielgestaltiges Lebenswerk in allen Gattungen. In Leipziger Volkszeitung vom 14 January 2011, p. 10.
- Helmut Loos: Karl Ottomar Treibmann zum 80. Geburtstag. In Newsletter des Instituts für Musikwissenschaft, January 2016, pp. 1f.
- Bernd Franke: Erinnerungen an Karl Ottomar Treibmann. In Newsletter des Instituts für Musikwissenschaft, März 2017, pp. 2f.
