= Gerd Schenker =

German percussionist

Gerd Schenker (born 2 June 1948) is a German percussionist.

== Life ==
Born in Zeulenroda-Triebes, Schenker attended the Musikgymnasium Carl Philipp Emanuel Bach from 1963 to 1965. From 1965 to 1969 he studied percussion with Otto Reil at the Hochschule für Musik "Hanns Eisler" in Berlin. From 1968 to 1972 he worked as a percussionist at the Volksbühne.

Since 1972 he has been active with the Leipzig Radio Symphony Orchestra (today MDR-Sinfonieorchester). In 1975 he became solo-percussionist. From 1974 to 1993 he was also a member of the Gruppe Neue Musik Hanns Eisler. With the ensemble he received the Art Prize of the German Democratic Republic (1980), the Kunstpreis der Stadt Leipzig (1986) and the Schneider-Schott Music Prize in Main (1991). In 1978 he founded the Leipziger Schlagzeug-Duo and in 1982 the Leipziger Schlagzeugensemble.

Schenker has performed compositions by Paul-Heinz Dittrich, Reiner Bredemeyer, Ruth Zechlin, Bernt Franke, Karl Ottomar Treibmann, Friedrich Schenker, (Gerd Schenker's brother) and Krzysztof Meyer among others. He is a member of the Forum Zeitgenössischer Musik Leipzig. Schenker is active as editor of percussion literature.

== Literature ==
- Zeitgenössische Musik für Schlagzeug : 1 Spieler. VEB Deutscher Verlag für Musik, 1988.
- Burkhard Glaetzner, Reiner Kontressowitz (ed.): Gruppe Neue Musik "Hanns Eisler" 1970–1990. Spiel-Horizonte. Leipzig 1990, p. 62.
