= Burkhard Glaetzner =

German musician and conductor

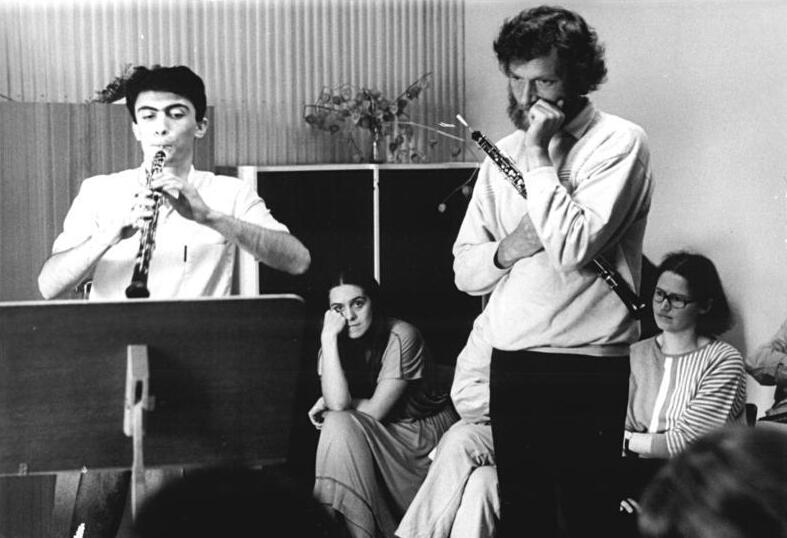
Burkhard Glaetzner (right in picture) at the 27th International Music Seminar in Weimar (1986)

Burkhard Glaetzner (born 29 May 1943) is a German oboe virtuoso und conductor. He is one of the leading oboe players in Germany.

== Life ==
Glaetzner was born in Poznań. His grandfather was the Goethe researcher Hermann August Korff, who last taught in Leipzig. In 1944 the family moved to Falkenhain/Saxony and in 1950 to Leipzig. In 1953 he received his first recorder lessons; two years later followed his first public appearance. After moving to Berlin (East) in 1957 he attended the Musikgymnasium Carl Philipp Emanuel Bach in the Rheinsberger Straße from 1958 to 1962. He changed to the oboe and received his first piano lessons.

After graduating from school in 1962, he took up oboe studies with Hans Werner Wätzig at the Hochschule für Musik "Hanns Eisler" in Berlin. In 1963/64 he won first prizes at the GDR University Competition for Wind Instruments. In 1965 he passed his state examination and became aspirant at the Berlin Academy of Music for one year. From 1966 to 1982 he was principal oboist in the MDR Leipzig Radio Symphony Orchestra under Herbert Kegel and Wolf-Dieter Hauschild. Since 1969 he also taught oboe at the University of Music and Theatre Leipzig, where he was appointed full professor in 1982. In 1992 he was appointed professor for oboe at the Berlin University of the Arts, now the Berlin University of the Arts. Among his students were Matthias Bäcker and Kai Rapsch.

In 1990 he was one of the founding members of the Forum Zeitgenössischer Musik Leipzig. Two years later, as a member of the "Constituent Working Group", he was co-founder and vice president of the Freie Akademie der Künste zu Leipzig, which was active until 2003. He also became a full member of the music class of the Sächsische Akademie der Künste in Dresden. In the context of the Handel Festival, Halle he was a juror in the competition for the Händel-Förderpreis der Stadt Halle. In 2013 he acted as chairman of the jury for wind chamber music at the Felix Mendelssohn Bartholdy University Competition of the Prussian Cultural Heritage Foundation. In 2017 he was patron of the Instrument of the Year (Oboe) proclaimed by the Landesmusikrat Berlin. Glaetzner is a member of the board of trustees of the Freunde des MDR Sinfonieorchesters.

== Importance ==
Frank Schneider counts him among the leading oboe virtuosos in the world. As most important oboist of his country, he encouraged "the development of an oboe repertoire in the GDR and Eastern Europe (Emmanouil Vitakis): He has performed more than 100 works, including oboe concertos by Reiner Bredemeyer, Georg Katzer, Friedrich Schenker, Christfried Schmidt, Friedrich Goldmann, Luca Lombardi, Gerhard Rosenfeld, Krzysztof Meyer and Toru Takemitsu.

Awarded numerous prizes at international music competitions, Glaetzner founded in 1968 the ensemble "Auslos trio" together with Wolfgang Weber (violoncello) and Klaus Schließer (bassoon). Later, Schließer moved up for Gerhard Erber (piano). With the trio he dedicated himself to baroque music and increasingly to new music. Together with the composer and pianist Friedrich Schenker he initiated the Gruppe Neue Musik Hanns Eisler.

Glaetzner (GDR) performed with Ingo Goritzki (GDR) in an oboe duo. Yun I-sang and Reiner Bredemeyer among others wrote duets for them. For solo pieces Glaetzner also worked among others with Nicolaus A. Huber, Hans-Karsten Raecke, Karl Ottomar Treibmann and Max E. Keller together.

In addition, he developed the ensemble I Solisti Instrumentali Leipzig in 1983 from many years of work with various specialists in baroque interpretation. From 1988 to 2003 Glaetzner was artistic director of the chamber orchestra of the Neues Bachisches Collegium Musicum. Concert tours followed through Europe, Asia and America as well while numerous music productions awarded with international prizes complemented his manifold activities as soloist, conductor and teacher.

== Awards and prizes ==
- Medaille at the Geneva International Music Competition (1968)
- 2nd prize for oboe at the International Music Competition of the Prague Spring International Music Festival (1968).
- 2nd prize at the Budapest International Music Competition (1970)
- Critics prize of the MaerzMusik (1977, 1981)
- Needle of Honour of the Verband der Komponisten und Musikwissenschaftler der DDR (1978)
- National Prize of the German Democratic Republic III. Klasse für Kunst und Literatur (1982)
- Deutscher Schallplattenpreis (1985)
- Georg-Philipp-Telemann-Preis der Landeshauptstadt Magdeburg (1990)
- Honorary member of the International Fasch Gesellschaft (1994)

with the Eisler-Gruppe:

- Honorary pin of the Association of Composers and Musicologists of the GDR (1988)
- Kunstpreis der DDR (1980)
- Kunstpreis der Stadt Leipzig (1986)
- Interprets prize of the Musik-Biennale Berlin (1989)
- Schneider-Schott Music Prize (1991)
- Best liste of the Preis der deutschen Schallplattenkritik (1996)

== Discography ==
His discography consists of more than 50 recordings of old and new music.

== Writings ==
- Burkhard Glaetzner, Reiner Kontressowitz (ed.): Spiel-Horizonte. Gruppe Neue Musik "Hanns Eisler" 1970–1990. Leipzig 1990.

== Literature ==
- Glaetzner, Burkhard. In Norbert Beleke (ed.): Wer ist wer? the German Who's Who. 45th edition 2006/2007, Schmidt-Römhild, Lübeck 2006, ISBN 978-3-7950-2042-2, p. 415.
- Glaetzner, Burkhard. In Alain Pâris: Klassische Musik im 20. Jahrhundert: Instrumentalisten, Sänger, Dirigenten, Orchester, Chöre. 2nd extended, completely revised edition, dtv, Munich 1997, ISBN 3-423-32501-1, p. 302.
- Glaetzner, Burkhard. In Axel Schniederjürgen (ed.): Kürschners Musiker-Handbuch. 5th edition. Saur Verlag, Munich 2006, ISBN 3-598-24212-3, p. 142.
