= Gerhard Erber =

German pianist and teacher (1934–2021)

- Born: 21 November 1934; Dessau, Germany
- Died: 4 September 2021 (aged 86); Leipzig, Germany
- Education: Musikhochschule Leipzig
- Occupations: Classical pianist; Academic teacher
- Organizations: Gruppe Neue Musik Hanns Eisler; University of Music and Theatre Leipzig
- Awards: International Johann Sebastian Bach Competition; Kunstpreis der DDR

Gerhard Erber (21 November 1934 – 4 September 2021) was a German classical pianist and academic teacher. He played as a member of the East German ensemble Gruppe Neue Musik Hanns Eisler, which focused on contemporary chamber music. He was a professor of piano at the University of Music and Theatre Leipzig, and organised a Bach competition in Köthen.

== Life ==
Born in Dessau, Erber was the son of the piano manufacturer Fritz Erber. He studied piano with Amadeus Webersinke at the Musikhochschule Leipzig from 1953 to 1959. Afterwards, he was the piano teacher of the Thomanerchor. In 1964, he achieved the third prize at the International Johann Sebastian Bach Competition.

He has a broad repertoire, with a focus on contemporary classical music and chamber music. In 1970, he was a founding member of the group Neue Musik Hanns Eisler, with Burkhard Glaetzner and Friedrich Schenker. This East German ensemble was one of the first to tour beyond the Iron Curtain, including several performances throughout Western Europe and Japan. The ensemble's mission was to keep the spirit of Hanns Eisler alive, which meant that they focused not on performing his work but on promoting new music. In 1971, he also became a member of the Aulos Trio, playing with Glaetzner and Wolfgang Weber.

He has played in piano duos, with Max Rostal, Oleg Kagan and Raffael Hillyer. They have performed in Europe, Asia and Central America. He performed the world premieres of piano works by Heinz Röttger, Georg Katzer, Reiner Bredemeyer, Gerhard Rosenfeld, Max E. Keller, Günter Neubert and Friedrich Schenker. As a member of the Eisler group he received several awards, including the Kunstpreis der Stadt Leipzig and the Kunstpreis der DDR in 1980, the badge of honour in gold from the Verband der Komponisten und Musikwissenschaftler der DDR in 1988, and the Interpretenpreis of the MaerzMusik, and the Schneider-Schott Music Prize in 1991. Erber made numerous recordings, also for radio. He recorded piano works by Erik Satie in 1991.

In 1972, he received an aspirancy for an academic degree, became a lecturer at the Hochschule für Musik "Felix Mendelssohn Bartholdy" in 1978, and was appointed professor of piano in 1990. Among his students were Steffen Schleiermacher and Josef Christof. He was involved in the Weimar Summer Course. In 1990, he was one of the founding members of the Forum Zeitgenössischer Musik Leipzig.

Erber was chairman of the performers' section of the Association of Composers and Musicologists of the GDR. He has also served as a juror at national and international piano competitions. He founded a Bach workshop for music teachers and students In Köthen in 1996, reviving a national Bach competition for young pianists there in 1999, which has been organized by the Köthen Bach Society since 2001. Erber became honorary chairman of the competition in 2013.

Erber died in Leipzig on 4 September at age 86.
