= Wolfgang Weber (musicologist) =

Wolfgang Weber (born 22 December 1939) is a German cellist.

== Life ==
Born in Szczecin, Weber studied violoncello from 1958 until 1961 with E. Neumann at the Hochschule für Musik Franz Liszt, Weimar. Privately he took lessons with August Eichhorn and Karl Grosch. From 1961 to 1965 he worked with the Konzerthausorchester Berlin. In 1965 he became principal cellist of the MDR Symphony Orchestra. In 1970 he became a member of the Gruppe Neue Musik Hanns Eisler and in 1971 of the Aulos-Trio. From 1974 he was a lecturer at the University of Music and Theatre Leipzig and the Hochschule für Musik Franz Liszt Weimar. The Leipzig Academy of Music appointed him professor in 1987. He was a juror at the International Instrumental Competition Markneukirchen. Concert tours took him through Europe and America. With the Eisler Group he received several prizes, including the Art Prize of the German Democratic Republic (1980).

== Literature ==
- Burkhard Glaetzner, Reiner Kontressowitz (ed.): Gruppe Neue Musik "Hanns Eisler" 1970–1990. Spiel-Horizonte. Leipzig 1990, p. 56
