= Hans Jürgen Wenzel =

German composer (1939–2009)

Hans Jürgen Wenzel (4 March 1939 – 8 August 2009) was a German conductor and composer. He was chairman of the Verband der Komponisten und Musikwissenschaftler der DDR and professor for musical composition at the Hochschule für Musik Carl Maria von Weber Dresden.

== Life ==
Born in Weißwasser, Wenzel first received a violin education at the University of Rostock. From 1957 to 1962 he studied conducting and musical composition with Ruth Zechlin at the Hochschule für Musik "Hanns Eisler" in Berlin.

From 1962 to 1965 he was ballet conductor and répétiteur at the Kulturinsel Halle. In 1965 Wenzel became musical director at the Thalia Theater (Halle). In 1969 he changed again to the Landestheater as conductor and composer. In 1976 he founded the Composer class Halle. The classes still exist today in Halle, Dresden, Magdeburg and Zeitz. Children and young people are accompanied there in the creative, compositional handling of sheet music and work together with musicians on their first own pieces.

From 1978 to 1988 he was conductor of the Staatskapelle Halle. From 1988 Hans Jürgen Wenzel worked as a freelance composer and conductor in Berlin and Halle, his special commitment was to New Music. He was the founder and director of special ensembles for new music, e.g. the Ensemble Konfrontation (Halle), the Ensemble Phorminx (Darmstadt) and the Ensemble United Berlin.

Wenzel was 1989 vice-president of the Verband der Komponisten und Musikwissenschaftler der DDR (VKM) and its President from 1989 to 1990. From 1990 to 1993, he was the successor of Wolfgang Lesser as head of the Verband Deutscher Komponisten (VDK).

After 2000, he was Honorary Professor at the Hochschule für Musik Carl Maria von Weber Dresden and also worked as a lecturer in composition at home and abroad. Among his students were Annette Schlünz, Uwe Krause, Karsten Gundermann, Michael Flade, and Alexander Keuk.

Wenzel died in Halle (Saale) at the age of 70.

== Awards and memberships ==
- 1968 Kunstpreis der Stadt Halle
- 1974 Verdienstmedaille der DDR
- 1974 Artur-Becker-Medaille
- 1975 Handel Prize
- 1978 Kunstpreis des FDGB
- 1979 Patriotic Order of Merit
- 1984 Art Prize of the German Democratic Republic
- 1986 Ehrennadel der Society for German–Soviet Friendship (in silver)
- 1986 Member of the Academy of Arts, Berlin (DDR)

== Work ==
=== Stage music ===
- Fridolin, ballet (Libretto H. Haas) (1965)
- Geschichte vom alten Adam, opera (text I. Rähmer after Erwin Strittmatter) (1972/73)
- Händel-Pasticcio for 2 actors, mezzo, tape, choir and orchestra (1984–86)

=== Vocal pieces ===
- Schwarze Asche, weiße Vögel, Solo cantata for baritone and string orchestra (1966/67)
- DENKMALSTANDORT, chamber oratorio to Prometheus 1982 for speaker, mezzo, bass, child's voice, chamber choir and instruments, texts by various poets (1981/82)

=== Orchestra and concert works ===
- Concerto for flute and orchestra (1966)
- Concerto grosso (1968)
- Concerto for cello and orchestra (1968/69)
- Train Symphony (1970)
- Concerto for large orchestra (1974)
  1. Tardo
  2. Pressante
  3. Teneraments
- Concerto for violin, string orchestra, harpsichord and percussion (1974)
- Bauhaus music for orchestra (1977/78)
- Concerto for organ and large orchestra (1979/80)
- Mourning and Fire II for chamber orchestra (1984/85)
- Symphony for large orchestra Grief and Fire III (1985)
- Sinfonietta for orchestra (1985–86)

=== Chamber music ===
- String Quartet No. 1 (1960)
- String Quartet No. 2 (1968
- String Quartet No. 3 (1970)
- Dilishanade, septet (1975)
- 12 exhibition music (1977–86), including the Schult-Musik (1980), the Eröffnungsmusik (1978) and the Trio (1980) for Otto Möhwald
- String Quartet No. 4 (1977/81)
- Approximation, for flute, clarinet, trumpet, 2 cellos and 2 percussionists (1980)
- Metallophonie I, exhibition music for metal works of different forms, material and sound possibilities as well as 3 flutes, trumpet, viola and cello (1981)
- Double musik I und II (1983/84 (joint composition with Friedrich Schenker)
- Second Bauhaus music for six wind instruments (1986)
- Inversion, group music for 8 players (1988)

=== Film scores ===
- 1971: Zeit der Störche
- 1973: Das zweite Leben des Friedrich Wilhelm Georg Platow
- 1977: Unterwegs nach Atlantis
- 1979: Einfach Blumen aufs Dach
- 1984: Romeo und Julia auf dem Dorfe
- 1985: Der Traum vom Elch
- 1987: Kindheit

== Literature ==
- Gerd Belkius: Hans Jürgen Wenzel: Konzert für Violine und Streichorchester. In Musik und Gesellschaft 26 (1976), pp. 76–80.
- Metamorphosen dreier Themen Georg Friedrich Händels von Hans Jürgen Wenzel. In Musik und Gesellschaft 28 (1978), pp. 273–277
- Hans Jürgen Wenzel. In Sigrid Neef (with Hermann Neef): Deutsche Oper im 20. Jahrhundert. DDR 1949–1989. on WorldCat Lang, Berlin 1992, ISBN 3-86032-011-4, p. 525 ff.
- Wenzel, Hans Jürgen. In Axel Schniederjürgen (ed.): Kürschners Musiker-Handbuch. 5th edition Auflage, Saur Verlag, Munich 2006, ISBN 3-598-24212-3, p. 511.
- Hans Jürgen Wenzel gestorben. In MusikTexte 123 (2009), p. 1.
- Bernd-Rainer Barth, Helmut Müller-Enbergs: Wenzel, Hans Jürgen. In Wer war wer in der DDR? 5th edition. vol. 2, Ch. Links, Berlin 2010, ISBN 978-3-86153-561-4.
- List of 30 publications in the German National Library.
