= Christfried Schmidt =

German composer (1932–2025)

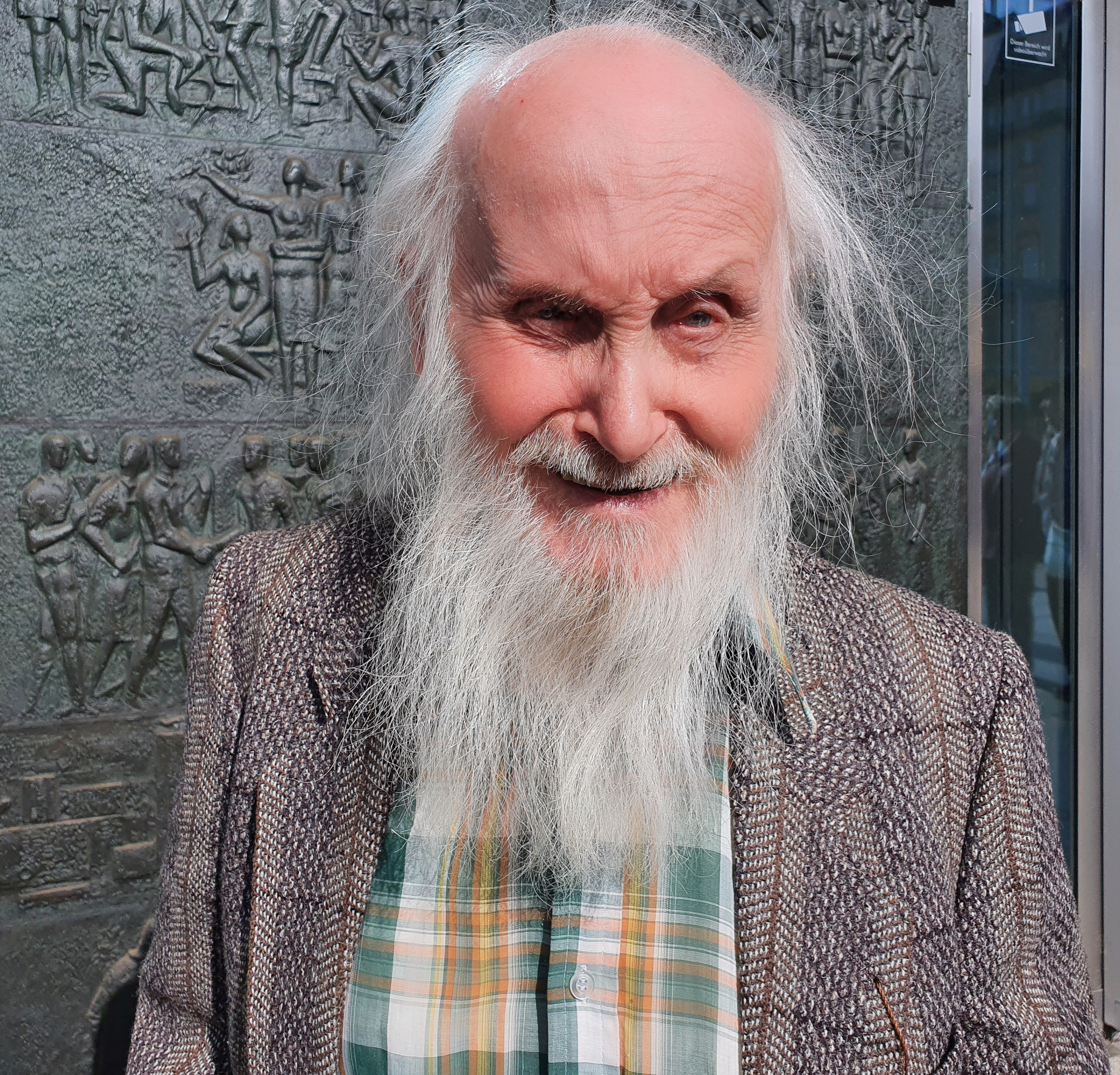
- Schmidt in 2021
- Born: 26 November 1932; Markersdorf, Saxony, Germany
- Died: 26 April 2025 (aged 92); Berlin, Germany
- Occupations: Composer; teacher
- Website: www.christfried-schmidt.de

Christfried Schmidt (German pronunciation: [ˈkʁɪstfʁiːt ˈʃmɪt]; 26 November 1932 – 29 April 2025) was a German composer who worked as a church musician and piano teacher. In composition, he felt mostly self-taught. Some of his works for large choirs and orchestras were not performed during the period of East Germany, but were premiered decades after he wrote them, such as his 1975 St Mark Passion in Berlin in 2019 and his 1968 Second Symphony in memory of Martin Luther King in Dresden in 2021.

== Life and career ==
Schmidt was born in Markersdorf in Upper Lusatia on 26 November 1932, the son of a miller. He attended the grammar school In Görlitz and received piano and organ lessons from Humperdinck's pupil Emil Kühnel. From 1951 to 1954, he studied church music at the Kirchenmusikschule Görlitz (B exam) and from 1955 to 1959 at the University of Music and Theatre Leipzig (A exam), organ with Werner Buschnakowski and composition with Johannes Weyrauch. In Leipzig, he familiarised himself with contemporary music with Hermann Heyer. He discovered compositions by 20th-century composers of the Second Viennese School on radio, music that was rarely performed in East Germany, being regarded as not suitable to socialist realism.

From 1960 to 1962, Schmidt was a church musician in Forst. From 1963 to 1964, he worked as kapellmeister at the theatre of Quedlinburg. From 1965 to 1980, he was a freelance piano teacher and choir director in Quedlinburg. He began to focus on composition which was mostly self-taught, teaching on three days per week and composing the rest of the time. In Warsaw, he met the Japanese musicologist Ichirō Tamura, who enabled him to perform his works in Japan, including the first premiere of one of his pieces in 1970.

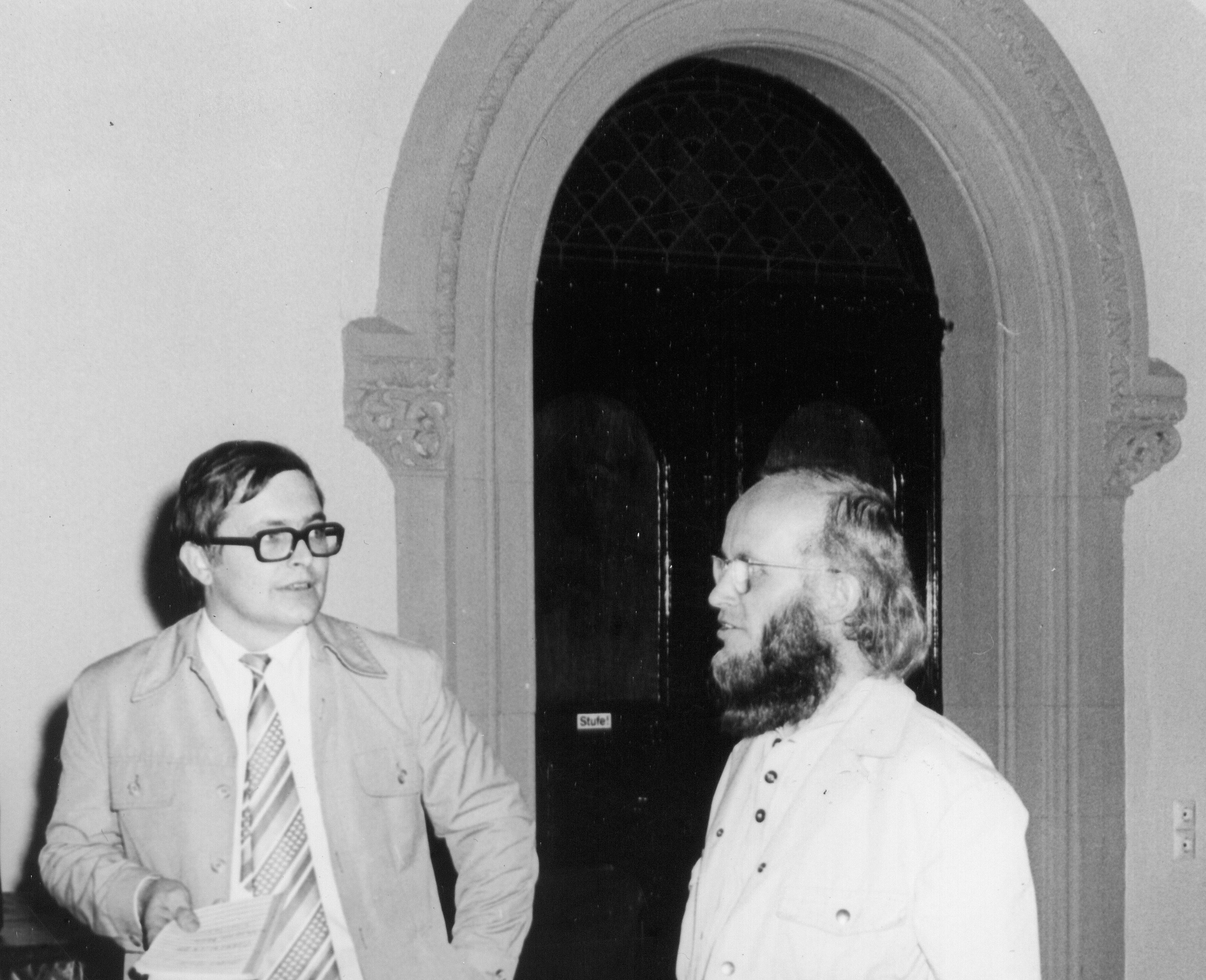
Schmidt (right) and musicologist Frank Schneider in 1976

From 1980 until his death, Schmidt lived as a freelance composer in Berlin-Prenzlauer Berg. Lacking commissions or a publisher, he composed major works for choir and orchestra. He was inspired by Bach, Anton Bruckner and Max Reger, and Alban Berg in the 20th century whose expressiveness based on formal construction was a model for his works. He preferred early works by Schoenberg to later more formal compositions, and felt close to the music of Bernd Alois Zimmermann. He travelled to the Warsaw Autumn festival several times where he was impressed by the free aleatoric music of Witold Lutosławski. Schmidt composed Lieder setting texts by Friedrich Hölderlin and Heiner Müller, and a cycle of orchestral works inspired by graphic art of Edvard Munch. Schmidt's artistic breakthrough came with the premiere of his Oboe Concerto performed by Burkhard Glaetzner at the DDR-Musiktage 1984. He remained an outsider in East Germany where his major works were not performed. He was a member of the Akademie der Künste der DDR from 1990 to 1991.

After the fall of the Berlin Wall, performances of Schmidt's compositions for large choirs and orchestra remained rare. He was a member of the Sächsische Akademie der Künste from 1998; the institution holds his archive. His new orchestral work Memento was premiered in 2002 in the Leipzig Gewandhaus by the MDR Leipzig Radio Symphony Orchestra conducted by Fabio Luisi. The work is memorial of the composer's mother. In 2009 his Munch-Musik was played, and a reviewer from Die Zeit described its "unheard colours, magical and sometimes intoxicating, a music about love". In 2019, the Sing-Akademie zu Berlin conducted by Kai-Uwe Jirka premiered his St Mark Passion from 1974 after 45 years. The highly expressive, headstrong work combines aleatoric compositional procedures with a polyphonic way of thinking in the wake of Bach and the Viennese School. It ends with a Kyrie described as humble. Schmidt's Second Symphony "In memoriam Martin Luther King" was produced for radio on 3 October 2021 by Deutschlandfunk, live from the Kulturpalast in Dresden with the Dresden Philharmonic conducted by Jonathan Stockhammer. His Horn Concerto, which includes an episode in memory of Nelson Mandela, and his opera have remained unperformed.

=== Personal life and death ===
Schmidt lived in Berlin from 1980, first in a basement apartment that he shared with a colleague. He was married; his wife also worked as an artist, and the couple had a daughter. They moved within Prenzlau.

Schmidt died in Berlin on 29 April 2025, at the age of 92.

== Awards and memberships ==
Schmidt's awards included:

- 1971: Composition prize in Nürnberg
- 1973: Composition prize in Stettin
- 1976: Composition prize in Trieste
- 1976: Composition prize in Nürnberg for Psalm 21
- 1978: Composition prize in Boswil
- 1987: Kunstpreis der DDR
- 1990: Member of the Academy of Arts, Berlin (until 1991)
- 1991: Johann-Wenzel-Stamitz-Preis of Künstlergilde Esslingen
- 1991: Composition prize of Mannheim
- 1998: Member of the Sächsische Akademie der Künste
- 1999: Berliner Kunstpreis

== Work ==
Year	Title	Premiere year	Premiere location
1965	Motet Landnahme after Hans Magnus Enzensberger for 8-part choir	1994	Berlin
1965	Motet An die Sonne after Ingeborg Bachmann for 6-part choir		
1967	Symphony No. 1 "Hamlet"		
1968	Symphony No. 2 "Martin Luther King"	2021	Dresden
1969	Piano Concerto	1974	Berlin
1969/1995	Kammermusik I ‒ "Von Menschen und Vögeln", for flute, oboe, trumpet and strings	1998	Görlitz
1970	Petite Suite	1970	Tokyo
1970	Psalm 21	1971	Nürnberg
1971	Wind Quintet	1974	Berlin
1971	Geistliches Konzert (Psalm 60)		
1971	Kammermusik II for flute (also Cor Anglais), clarinet in B (also bass clarinet), percusion and piano	1998	Görlitz
1971	Cantiones sacrae		
1972	Musica per i DueBoemi, for bass clarinet and piano		
1973	Kammermusik VI	1983	Berlin
1973	Tonsetzers Alptraum	1976	Dresden
1974	Violin Concerto	1991	Berlin
1974	Cello Concerto	1976	Leipzig
1974	St Mark's Passion	2019	Berlin
1974	Kammermusik VII "Epitaph auf einen Bohemien", for wind quintet and Klavier	1983	Berlin
1975	Die Niemandsrose und das Unsichtbare	2007	Nürnberg
1975	Aulodie, episodes for oboe	2001	Berlin
1976	Moments musicaux, pour piano		
1977	Flute Concerto	1978	Berlin
1978	Ein Märchen – kein Märchen, after texts by Harry Martinson, Eduard Mörike and Hugo von Hofmannsthal	1981	Berlin
1979	Ich, so voll Hoffnung, after texts by Hölderlin, for choir		
1979	Zwoller Schnitgerei, for organ		
1980	Munch-Musik (Sieben Orchesterstücke nach Graphiken von Edvard Munch) inspired by graphic art of Edvard Munch	1981	Leipzig
1980	String Quartet No. 2		
1981	Kammermusik VIII, for flute (also alto flute), oboe (also Cor Anglais), clarinet in B, percussion, piano, violin, viola and cello		
1981	Kammermusik IX		
1982	Die Zeit und die Zeit danach, after texts by Giuseppe Ungaretti, Cesare Pavese, Salvatore Quasimodo and Bachmann	1985	Berlin
1983	Oboe Concerto	1984	Berlin
1985	Orchestermusik I	1988	Berlin
1986	Kammermusik X, for trombone, piano and percussion		
1989	Das Herz, Opera after Heinrich Mann		
1990	Orchestermusik II, for oboe, cello and piano		
1996	Clarinet Quintet	1997	Berlin
1996/2000	Drei späte Lieder, for tenor und piano, after texts by Heinz Czechowski, Günter Kunert and Heiner Müller		
1996	Clarinet Quintet	1997	Berlin
1999	Orchestermusik V "Memento" 1	2000	Leipzig
2004	Orchestermusik VI "Memento" 2		
2006	Pièce de flûte	2007	Berlin
2013	Horn Concerto, in memory of Nelson Mandela		
2015	Canto funebre, in memory of Georg Elser, for piano	2017	Berlin

== Discography ==
- Entreß, Matthias R.; Schmidt, Christfried (2010). Christfried Schmidt – Komponistenportrait. DRK. OCLC 707194110.
- Schmidt, Christfried; Munch, Edvard; Kluttig, Christian; Pommer, Max; Clementi-Trio; Rundfunk-Sinfonieorchester Leipzig (1994). Munch-Musik : Orchesterstücke nach Graphiken von Edvard Munch : (1980). Mainz, Germany: WERGO. OCLC 163113218.
- Schmidt, Christfried; Hartmann, Andreas; Leipziger Schlagzeugensemble; Leipziger Hornquartett (2008). Leipziger Schlagzeugensemble (in German). Altenburg (Leipzig): Kamprad. OCLC 723752643.
- Eisler, Hanns; Kochan, Günter; Thiele, Siegfried; Matthus, Siegfried; Dessau, Paul; Bredemeyer, Reiner; Schubert, Manfred; Goldmann, Friedrich; Mauersberger, Rudolf; Weismann, Wilhelm; Asriel, André; Schmidt, Christfried; Schenker, Friedrich (1995). Musik in der DDR. Vol. II : Vokalmusik (in German). [Germany]: Berlin Classics. OCLC 811450660.
- Schmidt, Christfried; Zechlin, Ruth; Thiele, Siegfried; Friedrich, Felix (1989). Die Jehmlichorgel der Stadthalle Karl-Marx-Stadt (Chemnitz). Berlin: Dt. Schallplatten. OCLC 1281567655.
- Glaetzner, Burkhard; Kegel, Herbert; Schmidt, Christfried; Dresdner Philharmonie (1986). Oboenkonzert. Berlin: Dt. Schallpl. OCLC 257358865.
- Hindemith, Paul; Blacher, Boris; Domhardt, Gerd; Koerppen, Alfred; Schmidt, Christfried; Hölszky, Adriana; Schwehr, Cornelius; Huber, Klaus (2001). Musik in Deutschland 1950–2000 / Konzertmusik d, Vokale Kammermusik Kammerchor Serie. (1,d,31,50), 1950–2000 (in German). Munich: BMG Ariola Classics. OCLC 314167526.
- Otte, Hans; Schnebel, Dieter; Schmidt, Christfried; Finkbeiner, Reinhold; Hespos, Hans-Joachim; Wallmann, Johannes; Zacher, Gerd; Seiler, Erich; Gottwald, Clytus; Mai, Ludger; Schwarz, Peter; Darmstadt, Hans; Schumann, Peter; Rickenbacher, Karl Anton; Rundfunk-Sinfonieorchester Berlin; Vocalensemble (Kassel); Schola Cantorum (Stuttgart); Ars-Nova-Ensemble (Berlin, West) (2001). Alpha – Omega II. [S.l.]: BMG Classics. OCLC 163139701.
