= Eberhardt Klemm =

German musicologist

Fritz Eberhardt Klemm (4 September 1929 – 7 June 1991) was a German musicologist and journalist. He was one of the leading Hanns Eisler experts of the GDR.

== Life ==
Klemm was born in 1929 in Zwickau as the son of a teacher and attended the secondary school in Leipzig from 1940 to 1948. From 1949, he studied physics, mathematics and philosophy (under Ernst Bloch) at the University of Leipzig. In 1951, he changed to musicology with Walter Serauky, Hellmuth Christian Wolff and Rudolf Eller and received his diploma in 1954. From 1952, he was an assistant at the Institute of Musicology at the University of Leipzig, from 1954 to 1965 he was research assistant to Heinrich Besseler, from 1957 to 1966 he was a lecturer in musicology, and from 1961 he was the managing director of the institute on behalf of Besseler. In 1965, his dissertation on the Theorie der musikalischen Permutation ('Theory of Musical Permutation') was rejected due to his political views. In the same year, he left the university service. The reviewers of the thesis were Heinrich Besseler and Hellmuth Christian Wolff.

From 1965 to 1985, Klemm was a freelance musicologist without a permanent position. He was the editor of the piano works of Claude Debussy, Erik Satie, Gabriel Fauré, Louis Moreau Gottschalk, Hermann Scherchen and Scott Joplin as well as of Gustav Mahler's Symphony No. 6 and Hanns Eisler's orchestral suite. At the same time, he published historical works by Charles Burney, Claude Debussy, Anton Felix Schindler and George Bernard Shaw. From 1968, he published a revised version of Kurt Johnen's Allgemeine Musiklehre. From 1978 to 1982, he was also editor of the yearbook of Musikbibliothek Peters. He also worked as a radio programmer for Radio DDR 2.

In 1985, Klemm became director of the Hanns Eisler Archive at the Academy of Arts, Berlin. He worked there on the Hanns Eisler-Gesamtausgabe. In 1990, he was elected president of the Society for Musicology. In 1990, he was habilitated in Leipzig with a thesis on Textkritische Arbeiten zum Selbstverständnis der zweiten Wiener Schule. He published several works on music theory. The Neue Musik of Arnold Schoenberg, Anton Webern and Gustav Mahler played a major role in this. In the field of contemporary music, he conducted research on composers such as Alban Berg, Béla Bartók, Claude Debussy, Charles Ives, Max Reger, Gustav Mahler, Erik Satie, Karol Szymanowski, Arnold Schoenberg and Edgar Varèse. The musical styles Minimal music and New Simplicity were also relevant in his considerations.

As a music theorist, Klemm corresponded with personalities such as Theodor W. Adorno, Manfred Bierwisch, Ernst Bloch, Konrad Boehmer, Carl Dahlhaus, Ulrich Dibelius, Peter Gülke, Hans G Helms, Uwe Johnson, Mauricio Kagel, Georg Knepler, Aloys Kontarsky, Erwin Ratz, Alfred Schnittke, Rudolf Stephan, and Hans Heinz Stuckenschmidt.

With the musicians Gerd Schenker, Matthias Sannemüller and Steffen Schleiermacher, he founded the Forum Zeitgenössischer Musik Leipzig in 1990.

Klemm died in Leipzig at the age of 61.

== Honours ==
- 1978: Kunstpreis der Stadt Leipzig

== Publications ==
- Der Briefwechsel zwischen Arnold Schoenberg und dem Verlag C. F. Peters, in Deutsches Jahrbuch der Musikwissenschaft, Jg. 15 (1971), pp. 5–66
- Hanns Eisler. Für Sie porträtiert. Leipzig 1973
- Zur Geschichte der Fünften Sinfonie von Gustav Mahler. Der Briefwechsel zwischen Mahler und C. F. Peters und andere Dokumente, in Jahrbuch Peters, Jg. 2 (1979), pp. 9–116
- Spuren der Avantgarde. Schriften 1955–1991, Cologne: MusikTexte, 1997, 548 pages
- alles ist gleichnah zum mittelpunkt, edited by Thomas Schinköth, 2000
- Ossian an Béla. Über Benjamin und Bloch. Aus dem Briefwechsel zwischen Uwe Johnson und Eberhardt und Erika Klemm, edited by Erdmut Wizisla, in Johnson-Jahrbuch, vol. 11 (2004), pp. 11–28
