= Kai Rapsch =

German oboist and entrepreneur (born 1978)

Kai Rapsch (born 1978) is a German oboist, cor anglais player and entrepreneur.

== Life ==
Born in Berlin, Rapsch attended the Musikgymnasium Carl Philipp Emanuel Bach. At age 15 he entered the Julius-Stern Institute of the Berlin University of the Arts. From 1997 he studied in the oboe class of Burkhard Glaetzner. From 2000 to 2004, he studied with Günther Passin at the University of Music and Performing Arts Munich.

During his studies he was a member of the Mozarteum Orchestra Salzburg. Since 2004, he has been principal English horn and oboist with the Munich Philharmonic. He is also a lecturer at the Orchestra Academy there.

Recitals, chamber concerts and master classes have taken him to music festivals in Dresden, Salzburg and Mecklenburg-Vorpommern as well as to Japan and South Korea. As a soloist he has performed with the Mozarteum Orchestra Salzburg, the Chamber Ensemble Salzburg Orchestra Soloists, the Bach Collegium Munich and the Neues Bachisches Collegium Musicum in Leipzig.

In 2012, he founded the company Reeds for Oboes, with which he distributes handmade reeds for English Horn, oboe d'amore and oboes worldwide.

== Awards ==
In 1994–95, Rapsch was a music scholar of the Jürgen Ponto-Stiftung zur Förderung junger Künstler He has repeatedly been awarded at the federal competition Jugend musiziert. In 1999, he was a prizewinner at the international competition of the Konzertgesellschaft München. In 2000, he received the 2nd prize in the oboe competition of the Handel Festival, Halle, of the Händel-Förderpreis der Stadt Halle.

== Discography ==
- Various: LeiseLaute (Cybele Records/Deutsche Gesellschaft für Elektroakustische Musik, 1997)
- Dieter Schleip: "Komponiert in Deutschland 07" (Edition Filmmusik, 2008)
