= Matthias Bäcker =

German oboist

Matthias Bäcker (born in 1971) is a German oboist and university teacher.

== Life and work ==
Born in Schwerin, Bäcker received music lessons at the Conservatory "Johann Wilhelm Hertel" Schwerin and studied with Hans Werner Wätzig at the Hochschule für Musik "Hanns Eisler" in Berlin and with Burkhard Glaetzner at the University of Music and Theatre Leipzig. In 1994 he was accepted into the Karajan-Akademie as a young musician and was taught by Hansjörg Schellenberger. He also played in the Gustav Mahler Jugendorchester under Claudio Abbado and was a founding member of the Mahler Chamber Orchestra in 1997. He has had permanent engagements as solo oboist with the Berliner Symphoniker, the Nationaltheater Mannheim and from 1999 at the Deutsche Oper Berlin.

Bäcker has played with well-known orchestras such as the Berlin Philharmonic, the Bavarian State Opera, the City of Birmingham Symphony Orchestra and the Camerata Salzburg. As a soloist and chamber musician he has made guest appearances in Germany and abroad. In duet with the pianist Birgitta Wollenweber he performs works by Carl Philipp Emanuel Bach, Benjamin Britten, Robert Schumann, Georg Philipp Telemann, Johannes Brahms, Johann Wenzel Kalliwoda and Florent Schmitt.

Since 2005 Bäcker has been Professor for oboe at the Hochschule für Musik Franz Liszt, Weimar. He is a member of the Senate of the Hochschule.
