= Gitta Nickel =

German film director (1936–2023)

Gitta Nickel (May 28, 1936 Briensdorf, Province of East Prussia - December 18, 2023 Werder (Havel)) was a German filmmaker. She was one of the few female directors who was successful in the GDR. From the 1960s onward, she produced more than 60 films, some of which won awards at festivals.

== Life and work ==
The daughter of a dairy owner, she graduated from high school in Blankenburg (Harz). Nickel studied at the Humboldt University of Berlin Pedagogy and German studies. She completed her studies in 1957 with the state examination.

She then gained her first experience in the film business as an assistant director at DEFA. From 1959, she was also involved in the production of feature films in this capacity. In 1963, she moved to the studio for newsreels and documentaries. She again worked as an assistant director, primarily with Karl Gass. Two years later, she directed her first own film, We Understand Each Other.

In the following years, she increasingly shot documentaries in the Soviet Union. She was also interested in everyday life in the GDR and captured this in several productions. She worked almost exclusively with cameraman Niko Pawloff.

For GDR television, Nickel directed several cinematic portraits, including a film about the director Konrad Wolf in 1977. She let the people portrayed speak for themselves and largely refrained from commenting.

Since 1972 she was a member of the board, since 1977 of the presidium of the Association of Film and Television Professionals of the GDR.

== Filmography (selection) ==
- 1965: Wir verstehen uns
- 1967: Sibirien, mein Haus
- 1968: Lieder machen Leute
- 1969: Hier und dort
- 1970: Sie
- 1971: Palucca / Gret Palucca
- 1972: Heuwetter. Stories from Hohenselchow 1972 and 1963
- 1973: Die Söhne der Thai
- 1974: Paul Dessau
- 1975: ... und morgen kommen die Polinnen (TV movie)
- 1976: Das ist einfach mein Leben
- 1976: Die May
- 1977: Konrad Wolf
- 1980: Verbrennt nicht unsere Erde
- 1981: Manchmal möchte man fliegen
- 1982: Gundula, Jahrgang '58
- 1984: Renate Holland-Moritz
- 1986: Wenn man eine Liebe hat...
- 1987: Like a fish in water
- 1988: Two Germans
- 1996: Shalom Comrades
- 1999: I was a citizen of the GDR

== Awards ==
Some of her films received awards at various festivals in the GDR, such as the Findling Prize at the National Festival of Documentary Film of the GDR in 1982.

- 1973: Art Prize of the GDR
- 1974: National Prize III. Class
- 1984: Hero of Labor
- 1988: Art Prize of the FDGB for the continuous and convincing representation of the working class in documentary film

== Literature ==
- Hans-Michael Bock: Gitta Nickel - Dokumentarfilmregisseurin. In: CineGraph - Lexikon zum deutschsprachigen Film, Delivery 2, 1984.
- Kurzbiografie zu: Nickel, Gitta. In: Wer war wer in der DDR? 5. AusgabeBand 2. Ch. Links, Berlin 2010, ISBN 978-3-86153-561-4.
- Grit Lemke: Gitta Nickel - Helden ihrer Zeit.' In: Ralf Schenk & Cornelia Klauß (ed.): Sie - Regisseurinnen der DEFA und ihre Filme, Schriftenreihe der DEFA-Stiftung, Bertz + Fischer Verlag, Berlin: 2019, ISBN 978-3-86505-415-9, pp. 240–247.
