= Friedrich Schenker =

German composer (1942–2013)

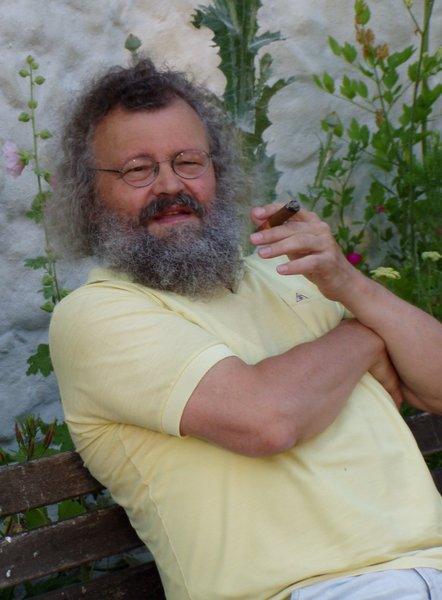
- Schenker in 2005
- Born: 23 December 1942; Zeulenroda, German Reich
- Died: 8 February 2013 (aged 70); Berlin, Germany
- Occupations: Trombonist; Composer
- Awards: Hanns Eisler Prize; Art Prize of the German Democratic Republic; Kunstpreis der Stadt Leipzig; Nationalpreis der DDR
- Website: www.annette-jahns.de

Friedrich Schenker (23 December 1942 – 8 February 2013) was a German avant-garde composer and trombone player.

== Life ==
Born in the German town of Zeulenroda, Schenker learned trombone and piano as a child and made his first compositional attempts at the age of 10.

At the Hochschule für Musik "Hanns Eisler" in Berlin he studied trombone from 1961 to 1965 with Helmut Stachowiak and music composition with Eisler's student Günter Kochan. During his studies he taught himself the technique of dodecaphony and played in a jazz band. After the instrumental Staatsexamen in 1964 he was employed as principal trombonist in the Rundfunk-Sinfonieorchester Leipzig until 1982. He continued his composition studies in evening classes at the University of Music and Theatre Leipzig until in 1968 with Fritz Geißler.

In 1970 he founded the Gruppe Neue Musik Hanns Eisler with the oboisten Burkhard Glaetzner and six other musicians from the Rundfunk-Sinfonieorchester and the Gewandhaus orchester in Leipzig. This special ensemble, which also included Schenker's brother, the percussionist Gerd Schenker, became the most important interpreter of contemporary chamber music of the avant-garde of the German Democratic Republic. Together with Ernst-Ludwig Petrowsky he also moved in the field of Free improvisation.

As a master student of Paul Dessau at the Academy of Arts, Berlin from 1973 to 1975, Schenker received important impulses for his artistic motivation and aesthetics. His membership in the Berlin Academy of Arts from 1986 onwards was followed ten years later by admission to the Sächsische Akademie der Künste as well as the Freie Akademie der Künste zu Leipzig. Until 1989 he was a member of the board of the Association of composers and musicologists of the GDR.

From 1982, Schenker was a freelance musician and composer. He was a consultant for new music at the Leipzig Gewandhaus (until 1989) and received lectureships for music composition and improvisation at the Hochschule für Musik und Theater Leipzig. From 2000 to 2002, he was theatre composer at the Staatstheater Kassel.

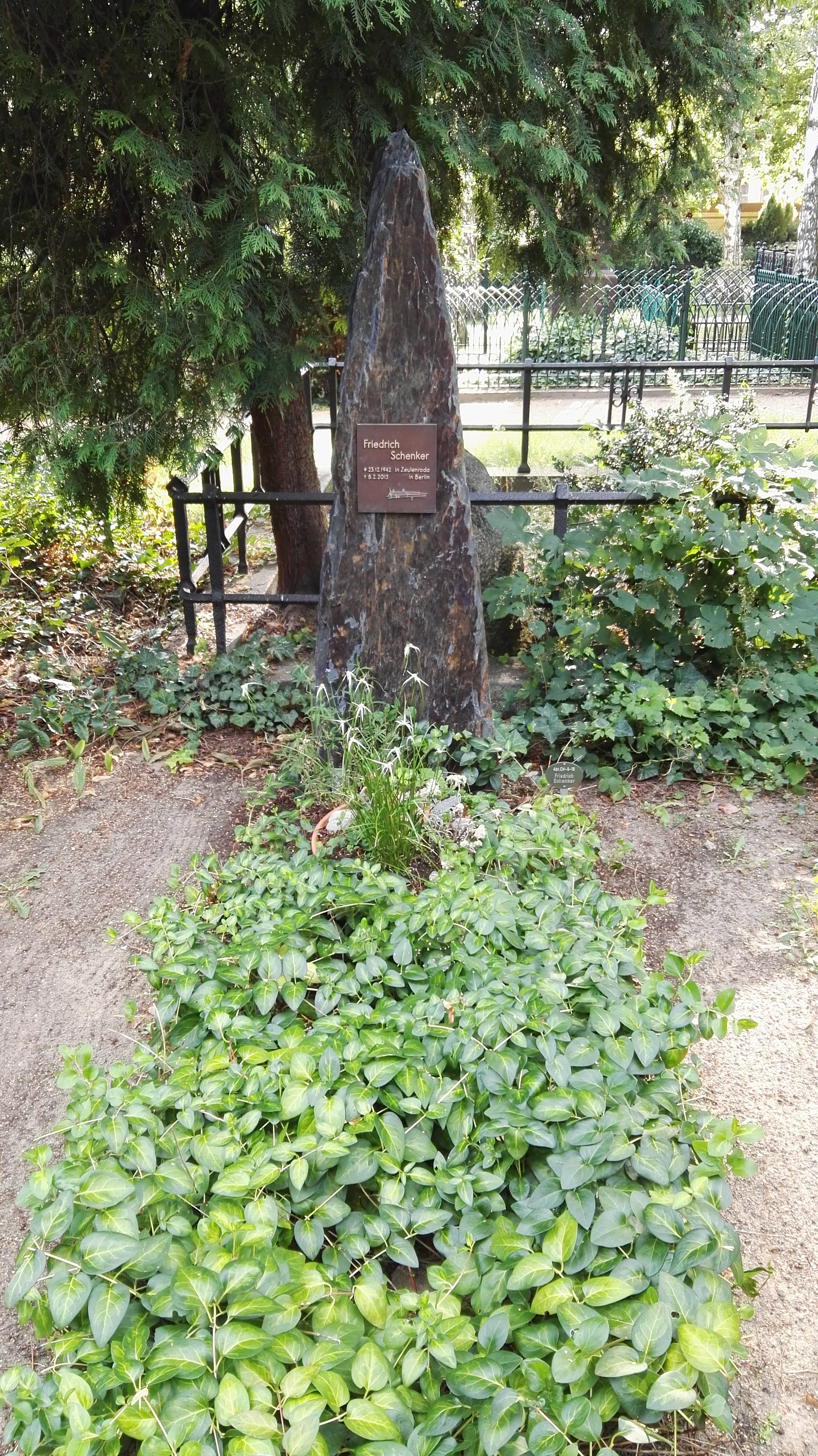
Schencker's grave

Schenker died in Berlin on 8 February 2013 at the age of 70 after a serious illness. He is buried at the Dorotheenstadt Cemetery.

== Compositions ==
Schenker's compositions include:

=== Vocal music ===
- Cantata I (text Vladimir Mayakovsky, director Hugo Huppert) for baritone and small wind orchestra (1967–1969)
- Kammerspiel I (from Christian Morgenstern's Galgenliedern and Palmström) for soprano, tenor, speaker and chamber ensemble (1972)
- Guide for budding lickspittles (text Vladimir Mayakovsky, Engl. Hugo Huppert) for soprano and clarinet (1974)
- The CHE Cantata (in remembrance of Che Guevara, text Bernd Rump for children's choir and instruments (1981)
- The celebration of peace (text Karl Mickel), aria di bravoura for tenor and eight instruments (1982)
- Preparation of a Hölderlin ode (text Karl Mickel after Friedrich Hölderlin, Ronald Reagan and Marina Cvetaeva), diary workshop for two voices, tape voice of a great mime and four instruments (1984)
- Michelangelico- Symphony (text Michelangelo, James Joyce, Hermann Broch) for speaker, mixed choir, children's choir, organ and large orchestra (1985)
- Ge- Schwitters (text Kurt Schwitters), five pieces for voice and saxophone (1986)
- Dream... Hope... A German Requiem, dedicated to Karl and Rosa (text Jakob van Hoddis, Johannes R. Becher, Georg Heym, Rudolf Leonhard, Johannes Bobrowski, Karl Liebknecht, Rosa Luxemburg) for alto solo, baritone solo, speaker and orchestra (1988)
- Commedia per musica for large orchestra with children's choir (1989)
- First Allemande for voices and ensemble (1990)
- Paragraph AIDS (text Karl Mickel) Cantata for woman and man with instrumental ensemble (1990)
- Fourth Allemande, symphonic historical spectacle for choir, orchestra, solo guitar, two brass bands, speaker and tape recorder (1995)
- Goldberg- Passion (text Karl Mickel) for solos, choir, children's choir and orchestra (1999)
- goethefauszweisschnittchen (text Friedrich Schenker) for voice and two tubes (2001)
- The Dresden Practice of Art (text Thomas Rosenlöcher), cycle for baritone and clarinet
- Les Trombones de Liszt (text Alphonse de Lamartine) for voice, two trombones and orchestra (2004)
- The Twelve (text Alexander Blok) for voice, oboe, viola and harp (2005)

=== Stage music ===
- Kammerspiel II Missa nigra (Latin mass / Alfred Polgar / Heinrich von Kleist / Theodor Körner) for seven instrumentalists, conductor, actor, synthesizer, tape, live-electronics and visual artist (1979 Leipzig, Altes Rathaus)
- Büchner (Klaus Harnisch) Opera for solos, choirs and orchestra (1979; 1987 Berlin, German State Opera)
- Bettina (Karl Mickel after Bettina von Arnim) Opera for one actress (mezzo-soprano), children's choir, tape and ensemble (1982; 1987 Berlin, Theater im Palast)
- Les Liaisons dangereuses / Gefährliche Liebschaften (the same after Choderlos de Laclos) op. ser. 2 acts for solos and orchestra (1993; 1997 Ulm, Theatre)
- (N(A(CH)T) (Novalis / Vladimir Mayakovsky / Sergei Yesenin / James Joyce, Søren Kierkegaard) Theatre for ten instruments (1995; 1996 Witten, theatre hall)
- Johann Faustus (Hanns Eisler / Friedrich Schenker) Opera for solos, choir and orchestra (2001; 2004 Kassel, State Theatre)
- Mord auf dem Säntis, chamber opera about a murder case of 1922, premiere on 4 June 2011 at the Säntis

=== Instrumental music ===
==== Orchestral and concert work ====
- 5 Bagatelles for trombone and orchestra (1964–1970)
- Little Symphony for Strings (1969)
- Concerto for oboe and string orchestra (1969–1974)
- Triple Concerto (Overture, Variations and Finale on the Rocco Aria from Beethoven's Fidelio) for oboe, bassoon, clarinet and orchestra (1969, rev. 1981)
- Bassoon concert (1970–1975)
- Piece for Virtuosi I for orchestra (1970, rev. 1985)
- Chamber symphony (1971)
- Symphony (In memoriam Martin Luther King) (1971)
- Electrization for beat or jazz group and orchestra (1973)
- Epitaph for Neruda for 18 solo strings (1973)
- Concerto for double bass and orchestra (1973)
- Landscapes for large orchestra (1974)
- Concerto for viola and orchestra (1975)
- Flute Symphony (1976)
- Sonata for Johann Sebastian Bach for large orchestra (1977)
- Orfeo – dramma per musica, pezzi concertati (1978)
- Fanal Spain 1936 (Hommage à Paul Dessau), Ballad for large orchestra (1981)
- Concerto for violoncello and orchestra (1985)
- Concerto for violin and orchestra (1986)
- Music for wind instruments, harp, celesta and percussion (1988)
- Solo for a Percussionist with Small Orchestra (1990)
- Divertimento (in veneration of Wolfgang Amadeus Mozart) for chamber orchestra (1991)
- ...into infinity..., orchestral piece for large orchestra (1992)
- Concert for 14 winds (1992)
- Symphony for strings (1993)
- U-Music No. 1 (Communicating Tubes), for trombone and brass ensemble (1996)
- ...dal animato al presto..., music for orchestra (1998)
- Oboe concerto (2002)

==== Chamber music ====
- Sextet for clarinet and 5 winds (1968)
- Trioballade for oboe, bassoon/violoncello and Piano (1968/69)
- Horn quintet (1969)
- Hörstück mit Oboe for oboe and tape (1971)
- String quartet no. 1 (1971)
- Sonata for wind and percussion instruments (1973)
- 3 Bagatelles for bassoon and clarinet (1975)
- Solo Duo Trio for violin/oboe, violoncello and clarinet (1975–1978)
- Tirilijubili- piece for virtuosi III for small flute, oboe, clarinet, bassoon and horn (1976)
- Frammenti di Orfeo for oboe, cor anglais, trombone, percussion, viola, violoncello and double bass (1978)
- Sergei Yesenin- Vladimir Mayakovsky- Recital for 8 instruments and tape (1979–1981)
- Orfeo: gioco- grido- canto, recitá for oboe and trombone (1980)
- Dona nobis pacem or At the new time for oboe and violoncello (1982); for organ and 6 percussions (1983), for large orchestra (1984)
- String Quartet No. 2 (Omaggio á Michelangelo Buonarotti e Dmitri Shostakovich) (1983)
- Ach Johann Sebastian Bach, concerti funebri e furiosi for 2 oboes and instrumental group (1984)
- Good relation to horses – new approximation and Mayakovsky for 8 instruments (1986)
- Trio pieces for violin, violoncello and clarinet (1986)
- Microcosm for 2 oboes (1986/87)
- Quintet for clarinet and 4 winds (1987)
- Witchcraft to Freeze the NAVY version for 8 instruments (1990)
- Second Allemande for 6 percussion instruments (1990)
- Age d'or, metaphorical music (after Arthur Rimbaud) for trombone, tuba, harp and violin (1991)
- Les Divertissements fantastiques des aventures musicaux for chamber ensemble (1993)
- Third Allemande (test- prelude to Beethoven's IX.) for ensemble (1994)
- Les Chants d'amour des crapauds for violoncello and bass tuba (1994)
- Trio for oboe, violoncello and clarinet (1998)
- Les Clarinettes des Vosges, Clarinet Quintet (2001)
- Communicating Tubes II for 4 trombones (2003)
- RAVEN'S MUSIC (to Edgar Allan Poe's Never More) for bass clarinet, violoncello/viola and percussion (2003)
- String quartet no. 3 (The one from the mountain) (2005)

===== Solo forms =====
- Monologue for oboe (1968)
- Piano piece about ASCH (1972)
- 3 pieces from "Livre pour piano" for clarinet (1975)
- Solo I come una musica di balletto for bassoon (1982)
- Solo II for flute (1983)
- Ombre di Michelangelo for clavichord (1984)
- Solo III for violoncello (1985)
- Solo IV for percussion (1985)
- Solo V- Winter Music for trombone (1986)
- Danton fragments. Comments for that. (1988)
- Solo IV (Béla) for viola (1991), dedicated to Eberhardt Klemm

===== Improvised music =====
- Dal Ngai with the EUPHORIUM_freakestra among others Günter Sommer, Hartmut Dorschner, Oliver Schwerdt (2002)
- 1 thigh, 1 codfish, beautiful summer in Birkenthal with the quartet "Endangered Species" and others Günter Sommer, Hartmut Dorschner, Oliver Schwerdt (2003)

===== Movie music =====
- 1991: The Case Ö.

==== Radio play ====
- 1980: Joachim Walther: Application to court – Director:Fritz Göhler (Radio play – Rundfunk der DDR)

== Awards and prizes ==
- Carl-Maria-von-Weber-Preis der Stadt Dresden (1971, 1986)
- Hanns Eisler Prize of the Rundfunk der DDR (1975)
- Badge of Honour of the Association of composers and musicologists of the GDR (1979, 1988)
- Art Prize of the German Democratic Republic (1980)
- Kunstpreis der Stadt Leipzig (1982, 1986)
- Nationalpreis der DDR (1989)
- Interpretation prize of the MaerzMusik in Berlin (1989)
- Prize of the critique music commission of the Association of composers and musicologists of the GDR zu den DDR-Musiktagen (1990) für die Musik für Blasinstrumente, Harfe, Celestra und Schlagzeug.
- Schneider-Schott Music Prize (1991)

== Literature ==
- Hermann Neef: Der Beitrag der Komponisten Friedrich Goldmann, Friedrich Schenker, Paul-Heinz Dittrich and Walter Thomas Heyn zur ästhetischen Diskussion der Gattung Oper in der DDR seit 1977. Dissertation, Halle 1989 Kontressowitz (ed.): Gruppe Neue Musik "Hanns Eisler" 1970–1990. Spiel-Horizonte. Leipzig 1990, p. 52.
- Friedrich Schenker. In Sigrid Neef and Hermann Neef: Deutsche Oper im 20. Jahrhundert. DDR 1949–1989. Peter Lang/Europäischer Verlag, Berlin 1992, ISBN 3-86032-011-4, p. 420ff.
- Frank Schneider: Friedrich Schenker. In Komponisten der Gegenwart (KDG). Edition Text & Kritik, Munich 1996, ISBN 978-3-86916-164-8.
- Christiane Niklew: Schenker, Friedrich. In Wer war wer in der DDR? 5th edition. Volume 2, Ch. Links, Berlin 2010, ISBN 978-3-86153-561-4.
- Schenker, Friedrich. In Brockhaus, Riemann Musiklexikon CD-Rom, Directmedia Publishing, Berlin 2004, ISBN 3-89853-438-3, p. 14244.
- Schenker, Friedrich. In Axel Schniederjürgen (ed.): Kürschners Musiker-Handbuch. 5. Auflage, K. G. Saur Verlag, Munich 2006, ISBN 3-598-24212-3, p. 406.
- Eckart Schwinger, Lars Klingberg: Schenker, Friedrich. In Grove Music Online. Oxford Music Online. 20 August 2012.
- Annette Thein: Friedrich Schenker. In Ludwig Finscher (ed.): Musik in Geschichte und Gegenwart (MGG), volume 14, Kassel 2005.
