= Reiner Kontressowitz =

German musicologist and lyricist

Reiner Kontressowitz (born 25 June 1942) is a German musicologist and lyricist.

== Life ==
Kontressowitz was born in Roßlau. After graduating from the Secondary School in 1961, Kontressowitz studied horn, drums, theory and composition at the conservatory in Halle from 1961 to 1963 and at the University of Music and Theatre Leipzig from 1963 to 1967. From 1967 to 1969 he was orchestral musician in Zeitz and in the Händelfestspielorchester Halle. He completed his studies of musicology at the Martin-Luther-University Halle-Wittenberg from 1971 to 1975 with the diploma thesis: Zur Konzertform bei Tomaso Albinoni.

From 1969 to 1981 he worked as editor, then responsible editor for contemporary music and head of the concert and stage department of the publishing house Edition Peters in Leipzig and from 1981 to 1991 as editor for contemporary music at Breitkopf & Härtel also in Leipzig; there he was responsible for programme conception and organisation of the publishing house's own and external events: such as the publishing house event series "Studio DVfM, Workshop DVfM, Seminar DVfM" and the "Young Composers' Working Group" as well as publishing house concerts in 1982 and 1985 as an encounter in the Gewandhaus. In 1985 in Landestheater Halle, in 1985 in the chamber music hall of the Cottbus Conservatory; in 1987 in the chamber music hall of the Bosehaus; in 1990 in the Alte Handelsbörse in Leipzig. Kontressowitz was a member of the Verband der Komponisten und Musikwissenschaftler der DDR. In 1990 he was co-founder of the Forum Zeitgenössischer Musik Leipzig. From 1991 he was lecturer for public relations and from 1999 to 2006 lecturer for practical music (KlA Bühnenwerke) at Bärenreiter-Verlag. Kassel.

== Publications ==
- Introductory lectures on the Neue Schubert-Ausgabe at master classes in Bad Bertrich, Graz, Lichtenberg, Lübeck, Essen, Dresden, Leipzig, Weikersheim, Rostock, Esslingen, Moers, Marburg, in Switzerland (Luzern among others) and in Czech Republic (Prague).
- Introductory lectures on the Neue Mozart-Ausgabe and to the total edition of Bärenreiter Verlag.
- Radio programmes about contemporary Swedish music and a portrait programme about the composer Claus-Steffen Mahnkopf in MDR Leipzig

Articles in magazines and daily newspapers:

- Neue Formen als Mittler zeitgenössischer Musik, in LVZ v. 18 Nov. 1982
- Concerto con molti compositori contemporanei, in Bulletin des Musikrates der DDR, Berlin 2/1983
- Reinhard Pfundt – Jahrgang 1951 Komponistenporträt, in Musik und Gesellschaft 11/1984
- Victor Bruns, in INFORM, Deutscher Verlag für Musik, Leipzig 1989
- Zeitgenössische Musik für Soloinstrumente, eine Editionsreihe des Deutschen Verlages für Musik Leipzig in Bulletin des Musikrates der DDR, Berlin 1/1990; u. a.

Book publications:

- Spiel-Horizonte with Burkhard Glaetzner about the Gruppe Neue Musik Hanns Eisler 1990
- Fünf Annäherungen zu den Solokonzerten von Friedrich Goldmann, Klaus-Jürgen Kamprad publishing house, 2014

Lyrics:

- lippen über den wolken und an den schweren füßen ketten. Verlag Jürgen Ritschel, 2009
- Erinnerungen - weinend sich betäuben with pictures of the Leipzig painter Gert Pötzschig, Verlag Jürgen Ritschel, 2011
- Wolkenkuckuckshain : Verse aus dem Traumgedächtnis. Verlag Jürgen Ritschel, 2015

Music editions (editor): TOMMASO ALBINONI, CONCERTI – Verlag Klaus-Jürgen Kamprad, Altenburg

- Opus II / Opera Seconda – i. V. 2020

Concerti a cinque con due Violini, Alto Viola, Tenore Viola, Violoncello e Basso continuo (ca. 1700) • CONCERTI 1 – 6, Sheet music ISBN 978-3-95755-632-5, STIMMEN ISMN 979-0-50258-137-4

- Opus V / Opera V – i. V. 2019

Concerti a cinque con due /tre Violini, Alto Viola, Tenore Viola, Violoncello e Basso continuo (ca. 1707) • Volume 1: Concerti 1 – 6, Sheet music ISBN 978-3-95755-633-2, STIMMEN ISMN 979-0-50258-144-2 • Volume 2: Concerti 7 – 12, Sheet music ISBN 978-3-95755-634-9, STIMMEN ISMN 979-0-50258-151-0

- Opus VII / Opera Settima – i. V. 2019

XII Concerti a cinque con Violini, Oboi, Violetta, Violoncello e Basso continuo (ca. 1715) • Volume 1: Concerti 1 – 6, Sheet music ISBN 978-3-95755-635-6, STIMMEN ISMN 979-0-50258-158-9 • Volume 2: Concerti 7 – 12, Sheet music ISBN 978-3-95755-636-3, STIMMEN ISMN 979-0-50258-165-7

- Opus IX / Opera Nona – 2018, Verlag Klaus-Jürgen Kamprad

XII Concerti a cinque con Violini, Oboi, Violetta, Violoncello e Basso continuo (ca. 1722) • Volume 1: Concerti 1 – 6, Sheet music ISBN 978-3-95755-637-0, STIMMEN ISMN 979-0-50258-172-5 • Volume 2: Concerti 7 – 12, Sheet music ISBN 978-3-95755-638-7, STIMMEN ISMN 979-0-50258-179-4

- Opus X / Opera Decima – 2018, Verlag Klaus-Jürgen Kamprad

XII Concerti a cinque con Violini, Violetta, Violoncello e Basso continuo (ca. 1736) • Volume 1: Concerti 1 – 6, Sheet music ISBN 978-3-95755-639-4, STIMMEN ISMN 979-0-50258-186-2 • Volume 2: Concerti 7 – 12, Sheet music ISBN 978-3-95755-640-0, STIMMEN ISMN 979-0-50258-193-0

Each Concerto is published as a single score edition, single part editions are also available.
