= Daniel Nazareth =

Daniel Nazareth (8 June 1948 – 19 June 2014) was an Indian composer and conductor.

== Early life and education ==
Born in Bombay, Nazareth began violin lessons aged seven. He earned degrees in Commerce and Economics from Bombay University in 1968, and a degree in piano from the Royal College of Music in London in 1969, where he won the Sir Adrian Boult Cup. He later attended the University of Music and Performing Arts Vienna and graduated with an Honours Diploma in Orchestral Conducting in 1975 under the tutelage of Karl Österreicher.

Nazareth was a prize winner at the 1974 International Nikolai Malko Conductors Competition in Copenhagen, Denmark. This led to a series of conducting engagements in Scandinavia and an opportunity to study privately with Igor Markevitch. In the summer of 1976, Nazareth was a recipient of both the Leonard Bernstein Conducting Fellowship and the Koussevitsky Music Foundation Conductor's Award at Tanglewood in the United States. There, his mentors included Bernstein, Colin Davis and Seiji Ozawa.

== Conducting career ==
On the invitation of Gian Carlo Menotti, Nazareth conducted his first opera, Cosi fan tutte, in summer 1977 at the Spoleto Festival, Italy. The next year he conducted The Marriage of Figaro, The Barber of Seville, and La Traviata for the Canadian Opera Company in Toronto, and also won the first Ernest Ansermet Conducting Competition in Geneva, Switzerland.

In March 1982 he conducted a version of Benjamin Britten's The Rape of Lucretia at the Arena di Verona in Italy. Nazareth was music director of the Teatro San Carlo from 1988 to 1990. In 1989, he served as music director of the Ente Lirico Festival at the Arena di Verona.

After the re-unification of Germany, Nazareth served as Chief Conductor of the MDR Leipzig Radio Symphony Orchestra from 1992 to 1996. He conducted the orchestra during a live TV concert at the Vatican in 1993 to celebrate the 15th anniversary of the papacy of Pope John Paul II. Video productions with MDR Leipzig included Beethoven's Missa Solemnis and Mass in C, Anton Bruckner's Te Deum, Gustav Mahler's Symphony No. 10, Mozart's Requiem and Carl Orff's Carmina Burana.

In August 2000, Nazareth conducted the Opera di Roma's Centenary Production of Giacomo Puccini's Tosca at the Roman Olympic Stadium and at the World Expo 2000 in Hanover, Germany. In July 2002, he conducted the first performance of Gustav Mahler's 5th Symphony in the New Critical Edition commissioned by the International Gustav Mahler Society, Vienna, at the Bregenz Festival, Austria.

Nazareth's recordings include the world premiere recording of Ottorino Respighi's Sinfonia Drammatica for the Marco Polo label. With the Bavarian Radio Symphony Orchestra, Munich, and the Munich Philharmonic, he has recorded Olivier Messiaen's L'ascension, Richard Strauss’ Aus Italien and other works.

== Compositions ==
Nazareth’s compositions include three piano trios, sonatas, Gitanjali Songs to texts by Rabrindranath Tagore, Gustav Mahler Songs, a series of "Concerti Sinfonici" for violin and orchestra, viola and orchestra, cello and orchestra, piano and orchestra, a singspiel "The Leonardo Bridge", an Italian opera, "Fontana dell' Amore", set in medieval Tuscany, the cantata "Children of Gandhi" and the Bara'a Symphony and "Evolution Symphony".

He wrote the screenplay Gustav and Alma that narrates the triumph and tragedy that overcast the last decade of Gustav Mahler's life.
