= Frank Schneider (musicologist) =

German musicologist

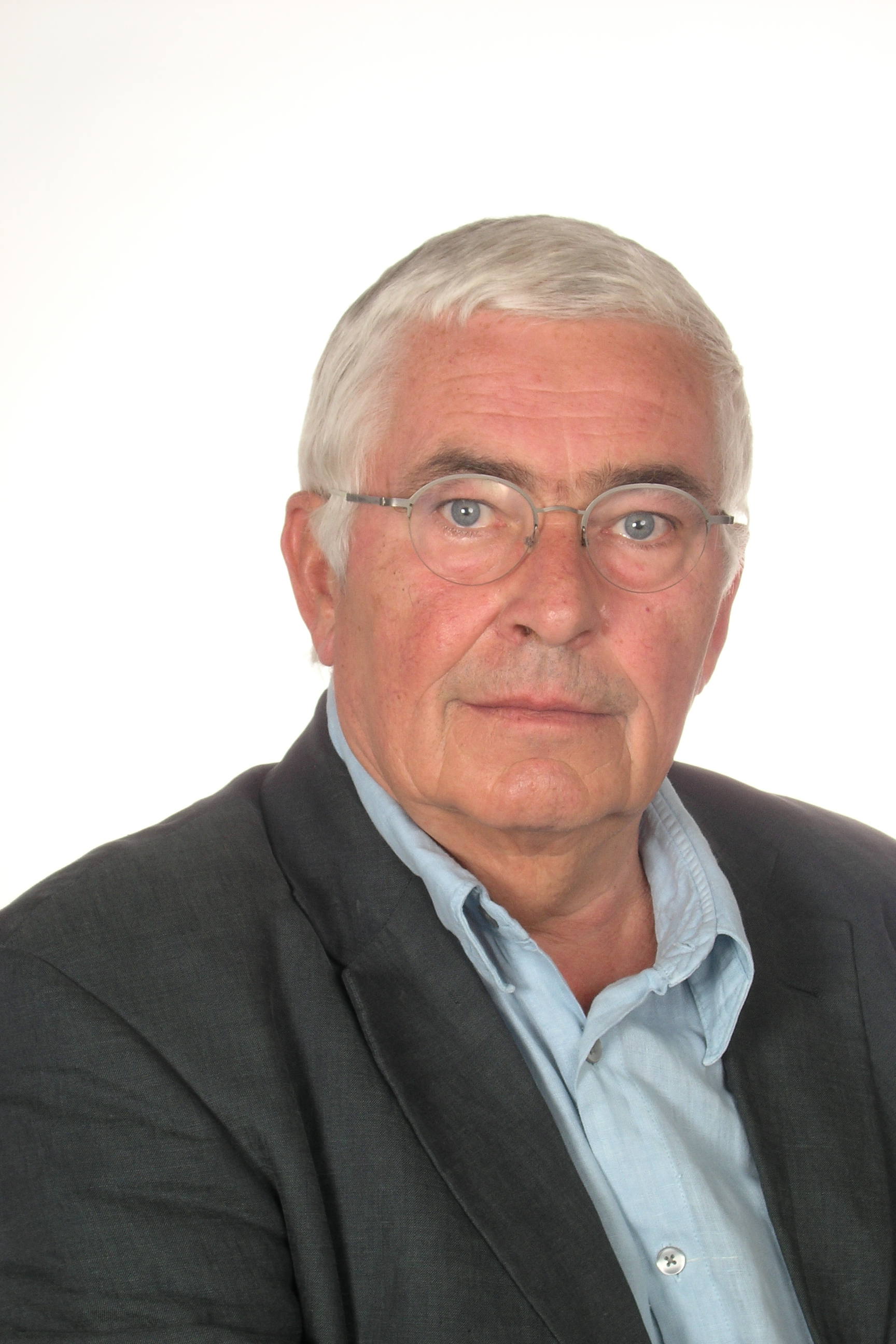
Frank Schneider

Frank Schneider (born 1942) is a German musicologist.

== Life ==
Born in Großerkmannsdorf, Saxony, Schneider studied Kapellmeister from 1961 at the Musikhochschule Dresden and from 1964 musicology at the Humboldt-Universität zu Berlin.

In 1968 he began working as an assistant at the Central Institute for Music Research at the Association of Composers and Musicologists of the GDR, and in 1971 he moved to the Humboldt University as an assistant, where he received his doctorate with a thesis on the string quartet works of the GDR. In 1975 he became a dramaturg at the Komische Oper Berlin and then, from 1980, a research assistant at the Institute for Aesthetics and Art Studies at the Academy of Sciences of the GDR in Berlin. After his Promotion B to Dr. sc. at the University of Greifswald with a thesis on political implications of composing, the academy appointed him professor in 1989. He took over the institute as director in 1990 until the dissolution of the academy. In 1992 the Berlin Senate appointed him director of the Schauspielhaus (later Konzerthaus) and the Berlin Symphony Orchestra (BSO, later Konzerthausorchester). He was active in this function until 2009.

From 1995 to 2005 he taught as honorary professor at the Hochschule für Musik "Hanns-Eisler" Berlin, in 2001 he was elected full member of the Sächsische Akademie der Künste, where he served as secretary of the music class from 2003 to 2008.

== Publications ==
- Momentaufnahme. Notate zu Musik und Musikern in der DDR. Reclam, 1979.
- Welt, was frag ich nach dir? Politische Portraits großer Komponisten. Reclam, 1988.
- Gesammelte Schriften von Alban Berg und Arnold Schönberg. Reclam 1981.
- Das Konzerthaus Berlin. Museums- und Galerieverlag, 1991.
- with Ulrich Dibelius: Neue Musik im geteilten Deutschland. Documents and comments in four volumes. Berliner Festspiel, 1993–1999.
- with Hermann Danuser: Editionsleitung der CD-Dokumentation des Deutschen Musikrates Musik in Deutschland 1950–2000.
- „von gestern auf heute“ – Schriften zur neuen Musik. Edited by Jürgen Otten, Stefan Fricke. Pfau, 2012.
- Eine Welt auf sechzehn Saiten. Gespräche mit dem Vogler Quartett. Berenberg Verlag, Berlin 2015.
- Immer auch ein politischer Impuls. Juan Allend-Blin in conversation with Christian Esch and Frank Schneider. Klaus-Jürgen Kamprad publishing house, Altenburg 2017.

Since 1995 he has been working on an internet database for the systematic registration of composed music from the past and present in terms of material and motifs, with over 330,000 entries to date.
