= MDR Leipzig Radio Symphony Orchestra =

German symphony orchestra

- Radio orchestra
- Native name: MDR-Sinfonieorchester
- Founded: 1923; 102 years ago
- Location: Leipzig, Germany
- Concert hall: Gewandhaus
- Principal conductor: Dennis Russell Davies
- Website: Official website

The MDR-Sinfonieorchester (MDR Leipzig Radio Symphony Orchestra) is a German radio orchestra based in Leipzig. It is the radio orchestra of Mitteldeutscher Rundfunk, the public broadcaster for the German states of Thuringia, Saxony and Saxony-Anhalt. It is one of the oldest Radio orchestras in the world and the oldest in Germany. It was founded in Leipzig, Germany in 1923 (9 months earlier than the Berlin Radio Symphony Orchestra), with 115 musicians. Apart from a short interruption during World War II, it has been the main orchestra of the Central German Broadcasting Company (MDR) since 1924. The orchestra performs concerts in Leipzig at the Gewandhaus.

== History ==
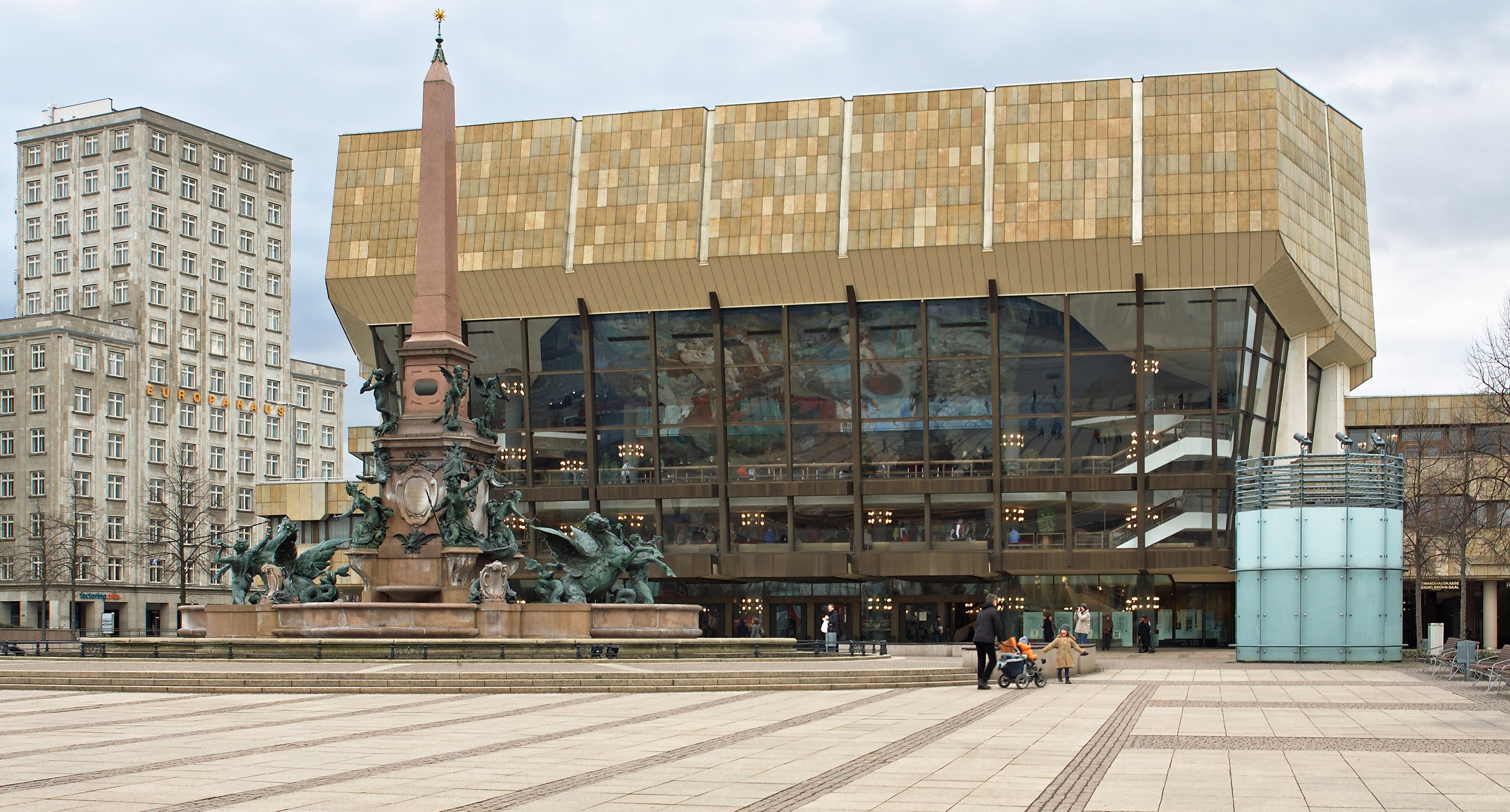
Gewandhaus, Leipzig (2011)

The orchestra was originally founded as "Orchester des Konzertvereins" ("Orchestra of the Concert Society"). It became the "Rundfunk-Sinfonieorchester Leipzig" ("Radio Symphony Orchestra Leipzig") in 1924 and later adopted its present name. The orchestra was dissolved during World War II and reunited in 1946 under the tenure of the conductor Hermann Abendroth, later conducted by Herbert Kegel. During the late 1970s through the 1980s, the principal conductors were Wolf-Dieter Hauschild and Max Pommer.

In 1992, the Rundfunk Symphony Orchestra merged with the Radio Philharmonic in Leipzig to form the MDR Leipzig Radio Symphony Orchestra. Daniel Nazareth was the first principal conductor of the newly formed MDR Symphony Orchestra after German reunification. Subsequent chief conductors have included Fabio Luisi, Jun Märkl, and Kristjan Järvi.

In November 2019, the orchestra announced the appointment of Dennis Russell Davies as its next chief conductor, effective with the 2020–2021 season, with an initial contract of 4 years. In April 2024, the orchestra announced an extension of Davies' contract through the 2026–2027 season.

== Ensembles ==
=== Chamber music ensembles of the MDR Symphony Orchestra ===
- Arcato Streichquartett (since 1999)
- Döring-Bläserquintett (since 1982)
- Kammersymphonie Leipzig (since 2006)
- Leipziger Hornquartett (since 1996)
- Leipziger Schlagzeugensemble (since 1983)
- Leipziger Blechbläsersolisten (since 1992)
- MDR Bläserquintett (since 1995)

=== Other ensembles ===
- Gruppe Neue Musik Hanns Eisler (1970–1993)
- Ensemble Sortisatio (since 1992)

== Principal conductors ==
- Alfred Szendrei (1924–1932)
- Carl Schuricht (1931–1933)
- Hans Weisbach (1934–1939)
- Reinhold Merten (1939–1940)
- Heinrich Schachtebeck (1945)
- Fritz Schröder (1945–1946)
- Gerhart Wiesenhütter (1946–1948)
- Hermann Abendroth and Gerhard Pflüger (1949–1956)
- Herbert Kegel (1953–1977)
- Wolf-Dieter Hauschild (1978–1985)
- Max Pommer (1987–1991)
- Daniel Nazareth (1992–1996)
- Marcello Viotti, Fabio Luisi and Manfred Honeck (1996–1999)
- Fabio Luisi (1999–2007)
- Jun Märkl (2007–2012)
- Kristjan Järvi (2012–2018)
- Dennis Russell Davies (2020–present)

== World premieres ==
This is a selected list of world premieres given by the orchestra:

- Franz Schreker: "Vom ewigen Leben" for soprano and orchestra (1929)
- Kurt Weill: Der Silbersee (1933)
- Fritz Geißler: Chamber Symphony (1955)
- Rudolf Wagner-Régeny: Genesis, Cantata for alto, chorus & orchestra (1956)
- Alan Bush: Symphony No. 3 "The Byron Symphony" with Baritone Solo and Mixed Chorus (1962)
- Günter Kochan: Symphony No. 1 (1963)
- Paul Dessau: Requiem for Lumumba (1964)
- Paul Dessau: "Deutsches Miserere" for mixed choir, children's choir, soprano, alto, tenor and bass soloists, large orchestra, organ and trautonium (1966)
- Wilhelm Neef: Piano Concerto (1971)
- Udo Zimmermann: L'Homme (1972)
- Edison Denisov: Cello Concerto (1973)
- Friedrich Schenker: Electrization (1975)
- Siegfried Thiele: Jeux pour harpe et orchestre (1975)
- Edison Denisov: Piano Concerto (1978)
- Georg Katzer: Piano Concerto (1980)
- Friedrich Schenker: Fanal Spanien 1936 (1981)
- Luca Lombardi: Symphony No. 2 (1983)
- Wilfried Krätzschmar: Heine Scenes (1983)
- Paul-Heinz Dittrich: "Etym" for orchestra (1984)
- Friedrich Goldmann: Symphony No. 3 (1987)
- Karl Ottomar Treibmann: Symphony No. 4 (1989)
- Paul-Heinz Dittrich / Sofia Gubaidulina / Marek Kopelent: Laudatio Pacis (1993)
- Krzysztof Penderecki: Concerto per violino ed orchestra No. 2 (1995)
- Carlos Veerhoff: Symphony No. 6 "Desiderata", for 3 soloists, speaker, chorus & orchestra, Op. 70 (1997)
- Milko Kelemen: Salut au monde (1999)
- Friedrich Schenker: Goldberg Passion (1999)
- Wolfgang Rihm: Penthesilea-Monolog for Soprano and orchestra (2005)
- Jean-Luc Darbellay: Requiem for Soloists, Choir and Orchestra (2005)
- Gene Pritsker: Cloud Atlas Symphony (2012)

== See also ==
- MDR Rundfunkchor
