= Hermann Neef =

Musicologist and theatre scholar

Hermann Neef (28 September 1936 – 24 August 2017) was a German musicologist and theatre scholar.

== Life ==
Born in Berlin, Neef worked from 1960-1973 at the VEB Deutsche Schallplatten in Berlin. Since 1973 he was at the Komische Oper Berlin, and since 1981 Neef has also been a lecturer at the Staatliche Ballettschule und Schule für Artistik (Berlin).

Neef wrote - often together with his wife, Sigrid Neef - scientific treatises on opera research as well as record reviews, specialist articles and several ballet libretti (for example to music by Richard Wagner, Jean Sibelius, Franz Schreker, Igor Strawinsky and Werner Egk).

Neef died in Beverungen in 2017 at the age of 80.

== Publications ==
- Der Beamte im nationalsozialistischen Führerstaat : Rede gehalten auf dem Reichsparteitagein Nürnberg am 8. Sept. 1934.
- Hermann Neef (with Sigrid Neef): Handbuch der russischen und sowjetischen Oper. Henschelverlag. DDR-Berlin, 1985. ISBN 3-362-00257-9
- Der Beitrag der Komponisten Friedrich Goldmann, Friedrich Schenker, Paul-Heinz Dittrich and Walter Thomas Heyn zur ästhetischen Diskussion der Gattung Oper in der DDR seit 1977. Dissertation, Halle 1989
- Hermann Neef (with Sigrid Neef): Deutsche Oper im 20. Jahrhundert: DDR 1949–1989. Peter Lang (publisher), 1992. ISBN 3-362-00257-9
