= Komponisten der Gegenwart =

The Komponisten der Gegenwart (KDG) is a music encyclopedia in the German language about composers of the 20th and 21st century. It is a looseleaf service with information on currently about 900 composers.

== Editors ==
Hanns-Werner Heister and Walter-Wolfgang Sparrer founded the encyclopaedia Komponisten der Gegenwart (KDG) in 1992 and since then publish it in the publishing house edition text + kritik. The loose-leaf work now comprises some 12,250 pages in 10 folders (63rd supplement, January 2018) and is updated and supplemented two to three times a year. It is available online for a fee.

== Structure ==
In alphabetical order, the articles are divided into biographies and work overviews. The biograms give an overview of the lives and awards of the composers. In the presentation of the works, and particular aesthetics and compositional technique are reflected historically as well as musically analytically. In addition, more than 200 composers are covered in more detail, with lists of works, selected discographies, bibliographies and music charts.

== Reception ==
The project was reviewed including:

- "Even experts in Neue Musik may discover a wealth of unknown names." ("Selbst Experten für Neue Musik dürften eine Fülle von unbekannten Namen entdecken.") in Berliner Zeitung
- The more than 200 international authors are recognised "specialists in their respective composers, who know how to describe their subject matter without beating about the bush and in concise language. ("Die über 200 internationalen Autoren sind anerkannte »Spezialisten für die jeweiligen Komponisten, die ohne Umschweife und in prägnanter Sprache ihren Gegenstand zu schildern wissen." in Neue Zeitschrift für Musik
- "The lexicon Komponisten der Gegenwart [...] cannot be renounced by those interested in music and those who truly love music." ("Auf das Lexikon "Komponisten der Gegenwart" [...] können die Musikinteressierten und die wahrhaft Musikliebenden nicht verzichten) in Kunst und Kultur

== Edition ==
- Hanns-Werner Heister, Walter-Wolfgang Sparrer (ed.): Komponisten der Gegenwart (KDG). edition text + kritik, Munich 2018, ISBN 978-3-86916-789-3 (Basic work including the 63rd subsequent delivery).
