= Gruppe Neue Musik Hanns Eisler =

- Origin: Leipzig, German Democratic Republic
- Genres: Contemporary classical
- Occupation: Chamber ensemble
- Years active: 1970–1993

Gruppe Neue Musik Hanns Eisler was an ensemble of musicians founded in 1970 in Leipzig with a focus on contemporary classical music, which played several world premieres and toured internationally. The ensemble disbanded in 1993.

== History ==
The ensemble Gruppe Neue Musik "Hanns Eisler" was founded in Leipzig on 17 December 1970 by composer and trombone player Friedrich Schenker, oboist Burkhard Glaetzner, pianist Gerhard Erber and others, to perform contemporary classical music. Its regular conductors were Max Pommer, Friedrich Goldmann and Christian Münch.

=== Repertoire ===
The core repertoire of Gruppe Neue Musik Hanns Eisler consisted of works by Arnold Schoenberg, Anton Webern and Hanns Eisler as well as Stefan Wolpe, Charles Ives and Paul Dessau. The group's mission was to keep the spirit of their namesake alive, which meant that they focused not on performing his work, but on promoting new music. More than 250 first performances by more than 70 composers include Edison Denisov's Trio, Nicolaus A. Huber's Demijour, Luca Lombardi's Einklang, Wolfgang Rihm's Kalt, Goldmann's Konzert für Posaune und 3 Instrumentalgruppen, Luigi Nono's Kolomb, and Alax by Iannis Xenakis. In addition, they played several East German first performances of works by international composers such as John Cage's Piano Concerto, Edison Denisov's Chorale-Variations, Dieter Schnebel's Glossolalie, Stockhausen's Zyklus, Iannis Xenakis's Nomos Alpha, Isang Yun's Piri and Bernd Alois Zimmermann's Intercommunicatione.

=== Tours and disbanding ===
Gruppe Neue Musik Hanns Eisler was one of the first East German ensembles to tour beyond the Iron Curtain, including several performances throughout Western Europe and Japan. They were often invited to the Steirischer Herbst, the Warsaw Autumn Festival, the Donaueschingen Festival and the Wittener Tage für neue Kammermusik among others. It was the most important ensemble for contemporary music in East Germany. Alongside ensemble intercontemporain and Ensemble Modern it was also one of the most respected contemporary chamber music ensembles in Europe. The ensemble disbanded after the fall of the Berlin Wall in 1993, considering its mission accomplished.

== Awards ==
- Art Prize of the German Democratic Republic (1980)
- Kunstpreis der Stadt Leipzig (1986)
- Schneider-Schott Music Prize (1991)

== Film ==
The group played Reiner Bredemeyer's music for the 1980 documentary film Kampuchea – Sterben und Auferstehen.

== Recordings ==
Recordings by the group were released by Wergo, including:

- Steffen Schleiermacher: Zeremonie
- Helmut Zapf: Zusammenklang II
- Nicolaus Richter de Vroe: Aus weißen Listen
- Reiner Bredemeyer: Septett 80 / Alle Neune
- Jörg Herchet: Kompositionen
- Friedrich Schenker: Die Friedensfeier
