= Sigrid Neef =

German musicologist

Sigrid Neef (born 10 October 1944) is a German musicologist and theatre scholar, focused on Russian and Soviet opera. She has been a dramaturge of the director Ruth Berghaus at the Deutsche Staatsoper Berlin for decades.

== Life ==
Born in Fraureuth, Neef worked at the Deutsche Staatsoper Berlin from 1972 to 1993. Like her husband, the musicologist Hermann Neef, she is an expert on Russian and Soviet music, with personal contact to Alfred Schnittke, Rodion Shchedrin, the Dmitri Shostakovich biographer Solomon Wolkow and the director-in-chief of the Bolshoi Theatre, Boris Pokrovsky. Since 1979, Neef has been the long-standing dramaturge of the director Ruth Berghaus, especially for opera.

Neef has translated numerous Russian and Hungarian operas, for example Glinka's Ruslan and Lyudmila together with Jörg Leipold, and works by Shostakovich, Shchedrin, Kyrill Vokov, Gleb Sedelnikov, Igor Rogaljov, Gennady Banshchikov, and Sándor Balassa.

Later, Neef focused on the field of animal protection, especially of cats.

== Publications ==
- with Hermann Neef: Handbuch der russischen und sowjetischen Oper. Henschelverlag Kunst und Gesellschaft, DDR-Berlin, 1985, ISBN 3-362-00257-9 and Bärenreiter, Kassel 1989, ISBN 3-7618-0925-5.
- Das Theater der Ruth Berghaus. Henschelverlag Kunst und Gesellschaft, DDR-Berlin 1989, ISBN 3-362-00356-7 and Fischer-Verlag, Frankfurt 1990.
- Paul Dessaus Beitrag zu einem neuen Operntypus. Dissertation. Halle 1989.
- (with Hermann Neef): Deutsche Oper im 20. Jahrhundert DDR 1949–1989. Verlag Peter Lang, Berlin [i. e.] Schöneiche bei Berlin [among others] 1992, ISBN 3-362-00257-9.
- Die Russischen Fünf: Balakirew – Borodin – Cui – Mussorgsky – Rimski-Korsakov. Monographien – Dokumente – Briefe – Programme – Werke. Verlag Ernst Kuhn, Berlin 1992, ISBN 3-928864-04-1.
- Die Opern Sergej Prokofjews. (Prokofiew-Studien 7 and Studia slavica musicologica 45). Verlag Ernst Kuhn, Berlin 2009, ISBN 978-3-936637-17-5.
- Die Opern Nikolai Rimsky-Korsakows. (Musik konkret 18). Verlag Ernst Kuhn, Berlin 2008, ISBN 978-3-936637-13-7.
- Die Opern Dmitri Schostakowitschs. (Schostakowitsch-Studien volume 8 and Studia slavica musicologica 47). Verlag Ernst Kuhn, Berlin 2010 ISBN 978-3-936637-20-5.

Articles, book contributions

- Im Spannungsfeld zwischen Felsenstein und Brecht. Gedanken zur DDR-Oper. In Theater der Zeit 34. Henschelverlag, Berlin 1979, pp. 6–8.
- Regisseure im Gespräch. Ein Gespräch mit Ruth Berghaus. In Theater der Zeit Berlin. issue 6, 1983.
- Ein Diskurs über Bertolt Brecht und die Oper. In Musik und Gesellschaft 26. Henschelverlag, Berlin 1985, issue 6, pp. 302–308.
- Ruth Berghaus und Michael Gielen – gefragt nach den Möglichkeiten von Oper in dieser Zeit. In Sinn und Form. Issue 4, Berlin 1987.
- Über das Hervorbringen und Verschwinden von Bildern. Zum Beispiel "Moes und Aron" von Arnold Schönberg. In Horst Seeger and Wolfgang Lange (ed.): Oper heute, ein Almanach 11. Henschelverlag, Berlin 1988.
- Wladimir Stassow und das Mächtige Häuflein. In Wladimir Stassow: Meine Freunde Alexander Borodin und Modest Mussorgski. Die Biographien (Musik konkret 4). Verlag Ernst Kuhn, Berlin 1993, ISBN 3-928864-06-8.
- Realismus ohne Ufer? Zu einigen notwendigen Korrekturen im Mussorgsky-Bild (1995). In Modest Mussorgsky. Zugänge zu Leben und Werk. Würdigungen – Kritiken – Selbstdarstellungen – Erinnerungen – Polemiken. (Musik konkret 8) Verlag Ernst Kuhn Berlin 1995 ISBN 3-928864-11-4
- Falsches Bewusstsein authentisch fixiert – Interessante Einblicke in unbekannte Dokumente. In "Ideologisch entartete Elemente". Dokumentation zur Ausbürgerung von Mstislaw Rostropowitsch und Galina Wischnewskaja aus der ehemaligen UdSSR (1974–1978) (opyt 2) Verlag Ernst Kuhn Berlin 1996 ISBN 3-928864-25-4
- Oper in der DDR. Offenes Kunstwerk bei geschlossener Grenze. In Oper im 20. Jahrhundert. Entwicklungen und Komponisten. Zdited by Udo Bermbach. Verlag J.B. Metzler, Stuttgart/Weimar 2000, ISBN 3-476-01733-8.
- Das kompositorische Werk Rimsky-Korsakows – Darstellungen und Dokumente. In. (Musik konkret 12, Source texts and treatises on Russian music of the 19th and 20th centuries) Verlag Ernst Kuhn Berlin 2000, ISBN 3-928864-15-7
- "Glory" oder" gorje" – Das jüdische Element in Schostakowitschs Opern (unter Einbeziehung von Fleischmanns "Rothschilds Geige"). In Dmitri Schostakowitsch und das jüdische musikalische Erbe. (Schostakowitsch-Studien, volume 3) (studia slavica musicologica 18) Verlag Ernst Kuhn Berlin 2001 ISBN 3-928864-75-0
- Die Streichquartette als Tagebuch innerer Entwicklung (Überblick und Stationen). In Schostakowitschs Streichquartette – Ein internationales Symposium (Schostakowitsch-Studien, volume 5) (Studia Slavica musicologica 22) Verlag Ernst Kuhn Berlin ISBN 3-928864-80-7
- Römische Fastnacht und geistliche Oper. Impulse des Jüdischen in der russischen Oper vom 18. bis 20. Jahrhundert. In Samuel Goldenberg und Schmuyle. Jüdisches und Antisemitisches in der russischen Musikkultur Jewish an Anti-Semitic Elements of Russian Musical Culture. Ein internationales Symposium. (Studia slavica musicologica 27). Verlag Ernst Kuhn, Berlin 2003, ISBN 3-928864-87-4.
- Infragestellungen: Der Künstler und die Macht – das kann doch nicht alles gewesen sein oder Sterben tun immer nur die anderen. In Dmitri Schostakowitsch – Komponist und Zeitzeuge (Schostakowitsch-Studien volume 2 and Studia slavica musicologica 17). Verlag Ernst Kuhn, Berlin 2009, ISBN 3-928864-70-X.
- Dialoge mit Schostakowitsch – Zum Beispiel Rodion Shchedrin. In Schostakowitsch und die Folgen. Russische Musik zwischen Anpassung und Protest. Ein internationales Symposium (Studia slavica musicologica 32). Verlag Ernst Kuhn, Berlin 2003, ISBN 3-928864-93-9.
- Allem widerstreben, was nicht Geist bedeutet. Prokofjew und die Sowjetmacht. In: Sergej Prokofjew in der Sowjetunion. Verstrickungen – Missverständnisse – Katastrophen. Ein Internationales Symposium (Prokofjew-Studien volume 1 and Studia slavica musicologica 35). Verlag Ernst Kuhn, Berlin. 2004, ISBN 3-936637-01-6.
- Nicht Aufbewahrung der Asche, sondern Weitergabe des Feuers. In Um das Spätwerk betrogen? Prokofjews letzte Schaffensperiode (Prokofjew-Studien volume 5 and Studia slavica musicologica 39). Verlag Ernst Kuhn, Berlin 2007, ISBN 978-3-936637-08-3.
- Intellektuell autonom-emotional verführbar. In Schräg zur Linie des Sozialistischen Realismus? Prokofjews spätere Sonaten sowie Orchester- und Bühnenwerke. Ein Internationales Symposium (Prokofjew-Studien volume 3 and Studia slavica musicologica 37). Verlag Ernst Kuhn, Berlin 2005, ISBN 3-936637-03-2.
- „Einen Gruß an eine Frau, die ihren schöpferischen Weg erleuchtet“. Zu Mira Mendelson-Prokofejewas Erinnerungstagebuch. In Mira Mendelson-Prokofjewa: Die Wahrheit über Prokofjew. Das Drama der letzten Jahre Prokofjew-Studien volume 4 and Studia slavica musicologica 38). Verlag Ernst Kuhn, Berlin 2005, ISBN 3-936637-07-5.
- Vom Verjüngen alter Stoffe. Goldmanns Opernphantasie „Hot“ und Dessaus Lustspieloper Leonce und Lena. In Sigrid Wiesmann (ed.): Für und Wider die Literaturoper. Zur Situation nach 1945. Laaber Verlag, 1982 ISBN 3-921518-67-9.
- Article in Pipers Enzyklopädie des Musiktheaters. Piper, Munich/Zürich 1986–1997, ISBN 3-492-02411-4 among others zu Alexander Borodin: Fürst Igor, Michail Glinka: Ein Leben für den Zaren und Ruslan und Ljudmila, Modest Mussorgski: Chowanschtschina, Dmitri Schostakowitsch: Die Nase und Katarina Ismailowa.
- Article in Die Musik in Geschichte und Gegenwart. 2nd edition Kassel 1994 ff. Diverse russische Komponisten wie Jewgenij Fomin.
- Musik aus Licht, Luft, Farbe und Bewegung. Zu Anatoli Ljadows Orchesterwerken. In Anatoli Ljadow. Zugänge zu Leben und Werk (Musik konkret 15). Verlag Ernst Kuhn, Berlin 2006, ISBN 978-3-928864-64-0.
- Zweitautorin von András Batta: Opera. Komponisten, Werke, Interpreten. Könemann Verlag, Köln 1999, ISBN 3-8290-2840-7.

In Russian language

- Aus dem Briefwechsel mit Alfred Schnittke (Is perepiski s Alfredom Schnittke, pp. 110–120). Im Sammelband zum 70. Geburtstag von Alfred Schnittke (Schnittke poswjaschtschajetsja. K 70-letiju kompositora), volume 4 (wypusk 4). Verlag der Komponisten (isdatelstwo kompositorow), Moskau 2014. Herausgegeben vom Schnittke-Zentrum Moskau, ISBN 5-85285-247-3.

Radio broadcasts to and with Ruth Berghaus

- Berliner Rundfunk, Rundfunk der DDR in the series Berlin – Weltstadt des Theaters
  - for the production of Das Rheingold by (Richard Wagner an der Deutschen Staatsoper Berlin). Broadcast on 3 October 1979.
  - for the production of Wozzeck (by Alban Berg at the Deutschen Staatsoper Berlin). Broadcast on 21 November 1984.

== Literature ==
- Irene Bazinger (ed.): Regie: Ruth Berghaus. Geschichten aus der Produktion, Rotbuch Verlag, Berlin 2010. ISBN 978-3-86789-117-2
- Daniele Daude: Oper als Aufführung: Neue Perspektiven auf Opernanalyse. Transcript. Theater. Bielefeld 2014.
- Corinne Holtz: Ruth Berghaus. Ein Porträt. Europäische Verlagsanstalt, Hamburg 2005. ISBN 3-434-50547-4
