= Klaus-Jürgen Kamprad =

German publisher and musicologist

Klaus-Jürgen Kamprad (born 27 November 1962) is a German musicologist, publisher, music producer and editor.

== Life ==
Born in Schmölln, Kamprad grew up near the Thuringian town Altenburg. From 1985 to 1990 he studied musicology at the Leipzig University, followed by research studies at the Museum of Musical Instruments of Leipzig University from 1990 to 1993.

In 1993 he founded the publishing house Klaus-Jürgen Kamprad and since then he has been publishing books on music and classical CDs on his querstand label.

Kamprad is a distant relative of Ingvar Kamprad, the founder of IKEA.

== Publications ==
- Klaus-Jürgen Kamprad: Hörbuch Kurt Masur : Peter Tschaikowski: Sinfonie Nr. 6 h-Moll op. 74 ("Pathetique") / Ein Leben in Tönen - Hörbuch, eine 70-minütige akustische Reise durch das Leben von Kurt Masur. querstand VKJK 0711
- Klaus-Jürgen Kamprad/Wilhelm Vogel: Von der Idee, sich selbst zu helfen 150 Jahre genossenschaftliches Bankwesen im Altenburger Land. im Altenburger Land. E. Reinhold Verlag, Altenburg 2009, ISBN 978-3-937940-61-8
- Unmögliche Geschichte(n)? Kaiser Friedrich I. Barbarossa und die Reformation.
- Historische Straßenbahnfahrt durch Altenburg.
