= Paul-Heinz Dittrich =

German composer (1930–2020)

- Born: 4 December 1930; Gornsdorf, Saxony, Germany
- Died: 28 December 2020 (aged 90); Berlin, Germany
- Occupations: Composer; Academic teacher
- Awards: Hanns Eisler Prize; National Prize of the German Democratic Republic

Paul-Heinz Dittrich (4 December 1930 – 28 December 2020) was a German composer and academic teacher. Based in East Berlin, he focused on chamber music, with many works inspired by poetry. His works were performed earlier in the West than in the East. He was an influential composer of contemporary classical music in Germany who taught internationally, including in the United States, Israel, and Korea.

== Life and career ==
Born in Gornsdorf, Saxony, on 4 December 1930, Dittrich studied composition with Fidelio F. Finke and conducting with Günther Ramin at the University of Music and Theatre Leipzig from 1951 to 1956. He was choral conductor with the FDGB Ensemble in Weimar until 1960. He studied further as a master student with Rudolf Wagner-Régeny at the Akademie der Künste in East Berlin from 1958 until 1960. He then worked as an assistant at the Hochschule für Musik "Hanns Eisler" in Berlin. In 1976, he was dismissed because he refused to compromise with the Communist regime. He turned to freelance composition.

In 1979, Dittrich was granted the title professor at the Hanns Eisler Hochschule in Berlin, but taught only from 1990. In 1981, he was scholar-in-residence at the Bellagio Center in Italy. In 1983, he was the first composer from the GDR to receive a commission from the Donaueschingen Festival. In 1984 he stayed at the IRCAM, invited by Pierre Boulez and the Sorbonne in Paris. From 1983 to 1991, he trained master students at the Akademie der Künste, including Klaus Martin Kopitz, Hannes Zerbe, Annette Schlünz and Péter Kőszeghy. In 1991, he founded the Brandenburg Colloquium New Music at the Musikakademie Rheinsberg, of which he was artistic director.

Dittrich held guest professorships at the Hochschule für Musik Freiburg on an invitation by Klaus Huber (1978), the Arnold Schönberg-Institut in Los Angeles and the University of California, San Diego (1980), the Hochschule für Musik und Tanz Köln in Heimbach (1988–89), the Samuel Rubin Academy Tel Aviv and the Hebrew University of Jerusalem (1990), and the Daegu University in South Korea, in Moscow and Saint Petersburg (1992). Dittrich was a member of the Akademie der Künste from 1983, and of the Sächsische Akademie der Künste in Dresden from 1989. He corresponded with personalities such as Carlfriedrich Claus, Burkhard Glaetzner, Vinko Globokar, Sofia Gubaidulina, Hans Peter Haller, Hans Werner Henze, Heinz Holliger, Herbert Kegel, Marek Kopelent, Aurèle Nicolet, Luigi Nono, Heinrich Schiff and Karlheinz Stockhausen. A comprehensive archive is located at the Akademie der Künste in Berlin.

Dittrich is considered one of the most influential composers of contemporary classical music in Germany. Some of his music can be considered to fall within the serialist tradition. He composed works for orchestra and chamber music, cantatas and Lieder. The Kammermusik (chamber music) pieces I (with tape), III (with voice), V (with live electronics), VII Die Blinden (with 5 speakers) and XI Journal de poèmes were commissioned by the Bläservereinigung Berlin. Many of his works were inspired by poetry, including works by Paul Celan, Heiner Müller and Arthur Rimbaud. In general, the words are not set as a vocal part but influence the work's structure. In Streichtrio nach dem Gedicht "Tübingen, Jänner" von Paul Celan, Dittrich instructs in the score that the Celan poem should neither be read nor printed in the programme. Dittrich also wrote staged works that set texts by Samuel Beckett, James Joyce, Franz Kafka and Heiner Müller. Some of his music, such as Concert avec plusieurs instruments and Kammermusik, mixes electronic instruments or tape with conventional instruments and voice. In 1995, he supplied one of the 14 movements of the Requiem of Reconciliation in commemoration of 50 years after the end of World War II.

On the occasion of Dittrich's 80th birthday, a concert dedicated to his works was held including the German premiere of Der Glücklose Engel for soprano and ensemble, setting texts by Heiner Müller and composed in 1997, and works from the 1970s and the 1990s. In 2014, the Staatsoper Unter den Linden in Berlin performed Dittrich's compositions Kammermusik VII on the theme Die Blinden by Maurice Maeterlinck from 1984 and Kafig-Musik from 1986 based on the story Die Verwandlung by Franz Kafka.

Dittrich died in Berlin at the age of 90.

== Awards ==
- 1972: Prize for composition of the Künstlerhaus Boswil, Switzerland
- 1975: Honorary Prize at the Composition Competition of the Italian Society for New Music
- 1976: Composition Prize at the International Competition in Trieste
- 1976: Prize of the International Rostrum of Composers of the UNESCO in Paris
- 1978: Hanns Eisler Prize of the radio of the GDR
- 1988: National Prize of the German Democratic Republic for art and literature, class III
- 1990: Prize of the Berlin Music Critics
