= Reiner Bredemeyer =

German composer

Reiner Bredemeyer (2 January 1929 − 5 December 1995) was a German composer.

== Biography ==
Bredemeyer was born in Vélez, Santander and went to school in Breslau. In 1944 he was drafted into military service and was briefly held as a prisoner of war of the American Army in Bavaria. After the end of World War II, he met composer Karl Amadeus Hartmann who introduced him to the music of Igor Stravinsky, Béla Bartók, Anton Webern, Edgard Varèse, Charles Ives and Erik Satie. From 1949 to 1953 he studied composition with Karl Höller at the Munich Academy for Musical Arts. In 1954 Paul Dessau took him to East Germany, where Bredemeyer became a master student of Rudolf Wagner-Régeny at the DDR Academy of Arts, Berlin.

He taught at the Ernst Busch Academy of Dramatic Arts in Berlin and worked together with Bertold Brecht, Walter Felsenstein and Ernst Busch. From 1957 to 1960 he was arts director at the Theatre of Friendship in Berlin and from 1961 kapellmeister and composer at the German Theatre. The composers of his generation (Friedrich Goldmann, Georg Katzer und Friedrich Schenker) broke with socialist realism and closed the gap to western Avant-garde music. In 1978 Bredemeyer became a member of the Academy of Arts and in 1988 he was appointed professor. Until 1989 he served as a board member of the GDR's composers' and musicologists' union. Bredemeyer died in Berlin. His grave is at Cemetery Pankow III, where many renown German artists are buried.

His oeuvre includes more than 600 works (of which around 300 are for theatre, film and audio drama), many of which have still not been performed in concert.

== Awards ==
- 1969: Art Prize of the FDGB
- 1969: Banner of Labor
- 1975: Art Prize of East Germany
- 1983: National Prize of East Germany
- 1983: FIPRESCI Prize at the Berlin International Film Festival
- 1986: Composition Award at the National Film Festival of the GDR
- 1989: Order of Merit for the Fatherland
