= Luca Lombardi (composer) =

Italian composer

- Born: 24 December 1945; Rome, Italy
- Education: Pesaro Conservatory; University of Rome; Hochschule für Musik Köln
- Occupations: Composer; Academic teacher
- Organizations: Pesaro Conservatory; Milan Conservatory

Luca Lombardi (born 24 December 1945) is an Italian composer.

== Biography ==
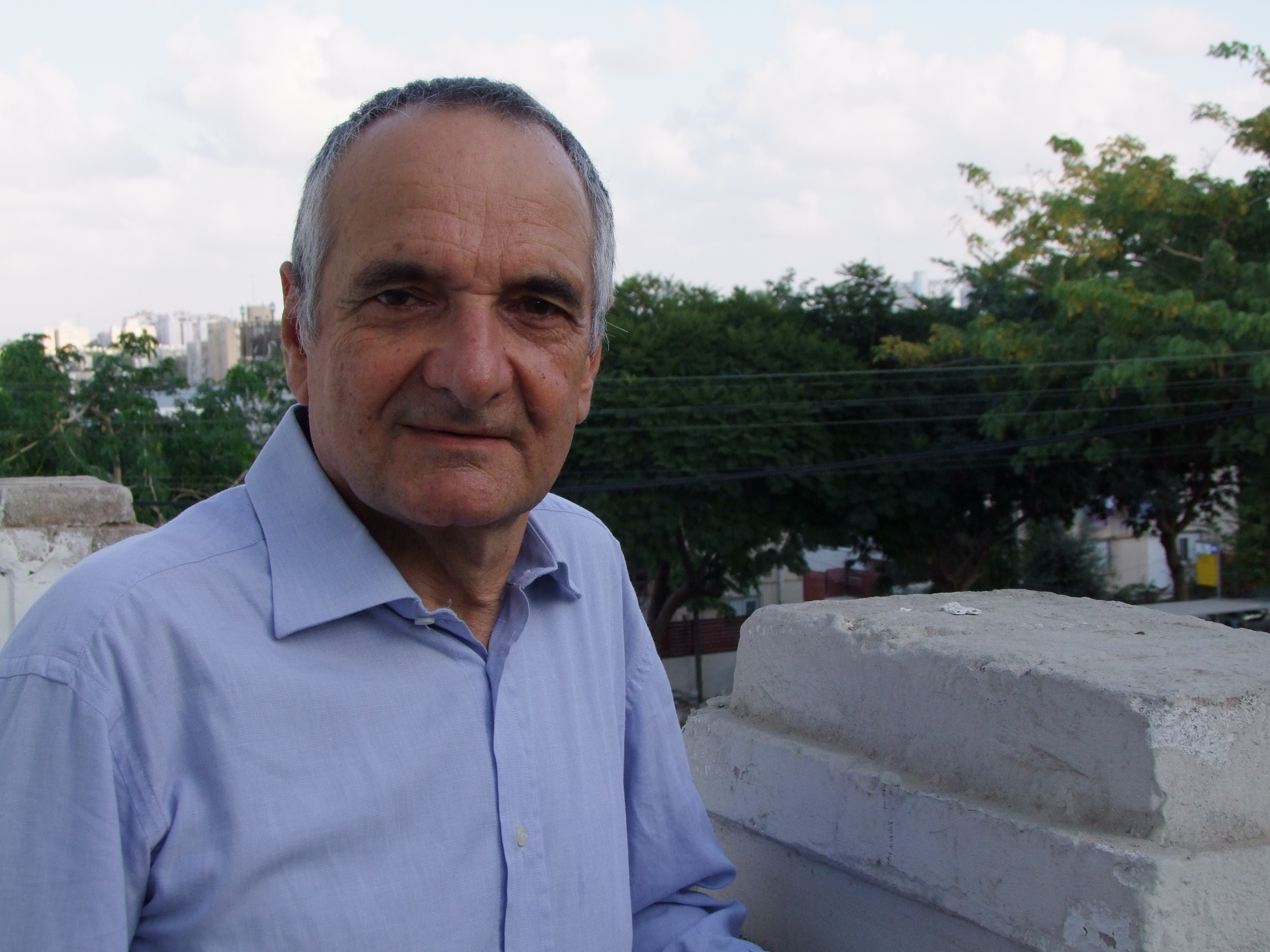

Lombardi was born in Rome. He studied composition initially with Armando Renzi and Roberto Lupi, later enrolling at the Pesaro Conservatory where he studied with Boris Porena, receiving his diploma in 1970. He then studied musicology at the University of Rome, graduating with a thesis on Hanns Eisler. From 1968 to 1972 he lived in Cologne where he studied with Karlheinz Stockhausen, Henri Pousseur, Mauricio Kagel, Dieter Schnebel, and Frederic Rzewski at the Cologne Courses for New Music, and with Bernd Alois Zimmermann at the Hochschule für Musik. He also studied for a time in Berlin with Paul Dessau in 1973 at the DDR Academy of Arts, Berlin. From 1973–1994 he was a professor of composition at the Conservatories of Pesaro and Milan, since then he is a freelance composer.

Lombardi composed around 180 works, including 5 operas, 3 symphonies, as well as numerous orchestral works and chamber music. His vocal-symphonic composition "Italia mia" was first performed at Milan’s La Scala in February 2012. He is a member of the Academy of Arts in Berlin and of the Bavarian Academy of Fine Arts (Munich).

== Personal life ==
He is married with Miriam Meghnagi and divides his time between the Lake Albano (Rome) and Tel Aviv.

Lombardi became an Israeli citizen : "as a small sign of solidarity with a land whose very existence stands in question".

== Works ==
Operas and other stage works

- Faust. Un travestimento (libretto by the composer, after E. Sanguineti) (1986–90)
- Dmitri oder der Künstler und die Macht, opera in 12 scenes and 1 epilogue (1994–99)
- Prospero (after William Shakespeare's play The Tempest) (2005)
- Il re nudo, divertimento in due atti (2008)

Orchestra

- Symphony No.1 (1974–75)
- Variazioni (1977)
- Symphony No.2 (1981)
- Framework, for 2 pianos and orchestra (1982–83)
- La Notte di S. Silvestro (1983–84)
- Symphony No.3, for soprano, baritone, choir and orchestra (1992-93)
- Concerto for Viola and Orchestra (1995)
- Terra, for large orchestra (2007)
- E, Concerto flute and orchestra (2009)
- Mare, for Orchestra (2012)
- Ennio, for small orchestra (2018, dedicated to Ennio Morricone)

Vocal Works

- Alle fronde dei Salici, for 12 voices (to texts by Salvatore Quasimodo, 1977)
- Tui-Gesänge, for soprano and 5 instruments (flute, clarinet, piano, violin and cello; to texts by Albrecht Betz,1977)
- Hasta que Caigan las Puertas del Odio, for 16 voices (to texts by Pablo Neruda, 1977)
- E subito riprende il viaggio, for 5 voices (to texts by Giuseppe Ungaretti, 1979–80)
- Majakowski, cantata for bass, mixed choir and 7 instruments (to texts by Mayakovsky, 1979–80)
- Mythenasche, for soprano, baritone, mixed choir and chamber orchestra (to texts by A. Betz, 1981)
- Storia di Giona, for bass-baritone, flute, guitar and percussion (text: Luca Lombardi, based on the Bible, 2009)
- Der Krug, for baritone and piano (text: Michael Krüger, 2010)
- Italia mia, for narrator, mezzosoprano, bass-baritone and orchestra (text: Dante, Petrarca, Leopardi, Quasimodo, De Gregori, Violante, Lombardi, 2011)
- Comparisons, for baritone and piano (text: R.S. Thomas, 2012)
- Richter, for narrator and electric guitar (text: Jean Portante)
- Römisches Nachtbild, for soprano and piano (text: Ingeborg Bachmann, 2014)
- Minima Animalia, five songs for voice and piano (Criceto, Zanzara, Moscerino, Porco, Pidocchi), (to texts by: Elio (Italian singer), 2000-2015)
- Dal diario di Nino Contini: 13.6.1940, for baritone and piano (2017)
- Cinque frammenti di Saffo, for female voice and piano (to texts by Sappho), 2017)
- Denkmal für einen Indianer, for baritone and piano. Testo: Friedrich Christian Delius
- Sarah & Hagar, for 2 sopranos and orchestra (text: Michael Krüger, 2019)

Chamber music

- Proporzioni, for 4 trombones (1968–69, dedicated to Bernd Alois Zimmermann)
- Non requiescat, musica in memoria di Hanns Eisler, for chamber orchestra (1973)
- Gespräch über Bäume, for nine instrumentalists (1976)
- Klavierduo, for 2 pianos (1978–89)
- Einklang, for oboe and cor anglais, horn, trombone, percussion, piano, viola, cello and double-bass (1980)
- Winterblumen, for flute and harp (1982)
- Sisyphos, for flute, clarinet, mandoline, guitar, marimba, harp, viola, and double-bass (1984)
- Sisyphos II, for 14 instruments (1984, dedicated to Luigi Nono)
- Sisifo felice, for eight instrumentalists (1985)
- Ai piedi del faro, for double-bass and eight instrumentalists (1986)
- String Quartet No.1 ("Quartett vom armen Mann", 1991–92)
- Bagatelles sans et avec tonalité, for piano four-hands (1992)
- Jahreswechsel, for chamber ensemble (1993–94)
- Addii, for violin, cello, and piano (1995–96)
- Infra, for 11 instrumentalists (1997)
- Geburtstagsgruß für Thomas und Bernhard, for violin and viola (2003)
- Einstein-Dialog, for flute and violoncello (2005)
- Gruss an Michael aus Prosperos Insel, for 3 trumpets (2005)
- Un Valzer per Roberto e Alessandra, con un pizzico di Tango e una fugace apparizione di Dmitri Šostakovič for piano four hands (2006)
- Warum?, Second String Quartet (2006)
- Bremer Trio, for flute, violoncello and piano (2007)
- Gilgul (2010, in memory of the victims of the nazi massacre of August 12, 1944 in Sant'Anna di Stazzema, Italy) for trumpet and organ
- Ein Walzer für Hans, for guitar and marimba (2011)
- Welcome and Farewell for 15 instruments (2012)

Solo instrument

- Albumblätter, for piano (1967–68)
- Wiederkehr, for piano (1971)
- Essay, for double-bass (1975, dedicated to Paul Dessau)
- Variazioni su Avanti popolo alla riscossa, for piano (1977, dedicated to Frederic Rzewski)
- Essay 2, for bass clarinet (1979)
- Schattenspiel, for bass flute (1984)
- A chi fa notte il giorno, for double-bass (1993)
- Rnnili, for viola solo (1995)
- Bab, for viola solo (2003)
- Delmen-Gruss, for piano (2003)
- Essay 3 ("Steiner"), for cello (2003)
- Nel vento, con Ariel, for flute (2004)
- Echo de Syrinx, for flute (2009)
- Tombeau für Hans, for piano
- Mendelssohn im Jüdischen Museum Berlin, for piano (2014, in memoriam Hans Werner Henze)
- Predah, for trumpet (2014)
- Für DiEtEr SCHnEBEl, for piano (2015)
- Per zuBin mEHtA, for piano (2016)

== Sources ==
- Ramazzotti, Marinella (2001). "Lombardi, Luca". The New Grove Dictionary of Music and Musicians, second edition, edited by Stanley Sadie and John Tyrrell. London: Macmillan Publishers.
- Lombardi, Luca (1982). "Construction of Freedom", translated by Franco Betti. Perspectives of New Music 22, nos. 1–2 (Fall-Winter 1983 – Spring-Summer 1984), pp. 253–264.
- Luca Lombardi, Construction of Freedom and Other Writings, edited by Jürgen Thym, Verlag Valentin Koerer, Baden-Baden, 2006
- Musik-Konzepte 164/165, Luca Lombardi, herausgegeben von Ulrich Tadday, IV/2014, edition text + kritik, München, 2014
