= Art Prize of the German Democratic Republic =

- Awarded for: "outstanding creative and interpretive achievements" in art
- Country: German Democratic Republic
- Presented by: Ministry of Culture of the Democratic Republic of Germany
- First award: 1959; 67 years ago
- Currently held by: defunct; last awarded in 1990; 36 years ago

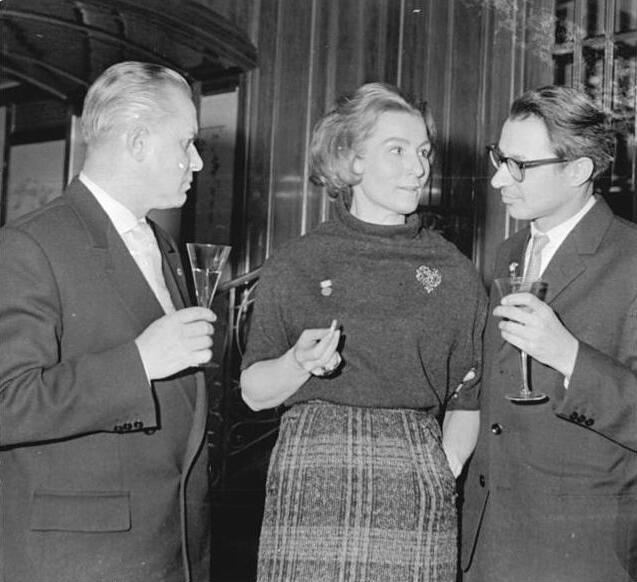
Inge Keller (middle) after receiving the Art Prize, 30 March 1960. Note the medal on her right breast.

The Art Prize of the German Democratic Republic (German: Kunstpreis der Deutschen Demokratischen Republik) was an East German state award bestowed on individuals for contributions in various fields of art.

== History ==
The Art Prize was annually awarded in recognition of "outstanding creative and interpretive achievements" in visual arts, applied arts, cinema, television, radio and entertainment. It could be conferred to individual recipients or in collective, to groups of no more than six people. The recipients were awarded a silver-coated metal medal, 20 millimeters in diameter, with the inscription Kunstpreis. Besides the medal, a single grantee would also be entitled to a sum of 6,000 East German Marks, while a collective would get a sum as high as 20,000 marks. The Art Prize was the country's highest honor for artists, and was outranked only by the National Prize of East Germany.

It was first awarded by Minister of Culture Alexander Abusch to nineteen recipients, on 22 January 1959. The Ministry's decree declared that it was bestowed "in recognition of outstanding and unique artistic achievements and for promotion of artistic creativity." The Art Prize was conferred twice more during the year, in April and October. It was again awarded thrice during 1960, in March, October and December. From 1961, it was conferred only once every year, on varying months. The last presentation ceremony took place on the night of 3 October 1990, just before the state was dissolved.

== Notable recipients ==
- Sylvia Geszty (1966)
- Peter Damm (1972)
- Konrad Wolf (1971)
- Wolf Kaiser (1961)
- Fred Delmare (1960)
- Inge Keller (1960)
- Angelica Domröse (1969)
- Peter Sturm (1961)
- Hannelore Bey (1970)
- Hartmut Haenchen (1984)
- Rolf Herricht (1973, 1977)
- Hans-Joachim Preil (1977)
- Karat (in collective, 1979)
- Günter Kochan (1959)
- Peter Konwitschny (1988)
- Dieter Mann (1975)
- Ulrich Thein (1969, 1984)
- Hans-Joachim Rotzsch (1967)
- Günter Sommer (1985)
- Adele Stolte (1966)
- Armin Mueller-Stahl (1963)
- Karl Gass (1970)
- Hannjo Hasse (1971)
- Siegfried Thiele (1983)
- Werner Dissel (1986)

== See also ==
- List of European art awards
