= Kunstpreis der Stadt Leipzig =

German art prize

From 1959 to 1989, the city of Leipzig awarded the Kunstpreis der Stadt Leipzig, which was given for outstanding merits in the artistic field to persons who promoted the reputation of the city beyond the region: architects, visual artists, composers, musicians, singers, actors and writers as well as literary and art critics.

== Prize winners ==
- 1959 Walter Arnold, "Neuland unterm Pflug"-Schauspielerkollektiv, Heinz Rusch and Rudolf Fischer
- 1960 Fritz Geißler, Paul Joachim Schneider, Walter Münze, Hanns Maaßen and the Kollektiv Architekt Berthold Schneider
- 1961 Heinrich Witz, Emmy Köhler-Richter, Ferdinand May and Wilhelm Weismann
- 1962 Gabriele Meyer-Dennewitz
- 1963 Hildegard Maria Rauchfuß
- 1964 Georg Maurer
- 1965 Hans Pfeiffer, Ottmar Gerster, Ingeborg Ottmann and Kollektiv Kurt Nowotny, Alfred Rammler, Rudolf Rohrer
- 1966 Annerose Schmidt, Georg Kretzschmar
- 1967 Gerhard W. Menzel
- 1968 Carlernst Ortwein, Hans Sandig, Wolfgang Mattheuer, Hans-Joachim Hegewald, Bernhard Schröter and the "Kollektiv des Leipziger Arbeitervarietes des FDGB"
- 1969 Peter Herrmann, Walter Schmidt, Manfred Künne, Wolfgang Müller, Heinz Wagner Gunter Walther, Ensemble „Deutsch-Sowjetische Freundschaft“, Ursula Tschesno-Hell, Michael Tschesno-Hell and Lothar Dutombé
- 1970 Werner Heiduczek, Fred Lohse, Bernhard Heisig
- 1971 Rudolf Skoda, Werner Tübke, Erhard Ragwitz
- 1972 Erhard Mauersberger, Ursula Mattheuer-Neustädt
- 1973 Jürgen Brinkmann and Friedhelm Eberle
- 1974 "Wallenstein"Inszenierungskollektiv der Leipziger Theater, Künstlerkollektiv für die Schaffung des Hochreliefs für die Karl-Marx-Universität (Rolf Kuhrt, Frank Ruddigkeit, Klaus Schwabe), Thomanerchor and Gewandhauschor
- 1975 Karl Krug
- 1976 Ring des Nibelungen-Inszenierungskollektiv (among others Joachim Herz, Sigrid Kehl, Gert Bahner, Andreas Pieske and Helmut Ernst, Heinz Krause-Graumnitz)
- 1978 Kurt Masur, Irmgard Horlbeck-Kappler, Ulrich Hachulla, Rundfunk-Kinderchor Leipzig, Gertrud Oertel, Helmut Richter, Günter Meißner and Eberhardt Klemm
- 1979 Dietrich Burger, Horst Förster, Gert Gütschow, Karl-Wilhelm Hahnemann, Gunter Preuß, Henry Schumann, Siegfried Thiele, Werner Wolf, Leipziger Opernchor, Gewandhaus Bläserquintett, Akademisches Orchester Leipzig
- 1980 Gerhard Bosse, Günter Lohse, Gotthard Müller, Helmut Bartuschek, Günter Horlbeck, Günther Garbe, Olaf Didam, Karl-Max Kober and Fritz Kämpfer
- 1981 Rosemarie Lang, Karl Ottomar Treibmann, Karl Mehlich, Elisabeth Schulz-Semrau, Günter Richter, Ulrike Oelzner, Thomas Oelzner, Leipziger Synagogalchor (Ltg. Helmut Klotz), Georg Antosch, Günter Hofmann and Boris Prokrowski
- 1982 Walter Eichenberg, Hans-Joachim Förster, Friedrich Schenker, Jürgen Lehmann, Erich Gerberding, Manfred Stephan, Monika Winkler and Horst Galle
- 1983 Leipziger Hornquartett, Egbert Herfurth, Wolfgang Peuker, Udo Klement
- 1984 Karl-Georg Kayser, Gottfried Richter, MDR Sinfonieorchester, MDR Rundfunkchor Leipzig, Rolf Seidel, Gisela Keller-Oechelhaeuser, Gert Pötzschig, Evelyn Richter, Peter Gosse, Karl Zumpe, Werner Bachmann, Günter Neubert and Horst Pieroh
- 1985 Hans Grüß, Adel Karasholi, Věnceslava Hrubá-Freiberger, Rudolf Riemer, Arnd Schultheiß, Roselind Czernetzky, Ute Holstein, Rainer Behrens and Günter Latsch
- 1986 Gruppe Neue Musik Hanns Eisler, Wolfgang Hauswald, Roland Seiffarth, Günter Schwarzlose, Heinz Zander, Dieter Nentwig, Angela Stachowa, Dieter Gleisberg and Peter Reichel
- 1987 Peter Sylvester, Hans-Joachim Rotzsch, Frank Schöbel
- 1988 GewandhausKinderchor, Jürgen Kurth, Roger Rössing and Renate Rössing
- 1989 Evelyn Richter, Berndt Stübner, Arno Rink
