= Reinhard Pfundt =

German pianist, composer and academic teacher

- Born: 1951 (age 73–74); Burgstädt
- Education: Musikhochschule Leipzig
- Occupations: Pianist; Composer; Academic teacher
- Organizations: University of Music and Theatre Leipzig
- Awards: Hans Tieber Prize; Hanns-Eisler-Preis

Reinhard Pfundt (born in 1951) is a German pianist, composer and academic teacher at the University of Music and Theatre Leipzig. He wrote orchestral works, chamber music and songs, and was awarded prizes in the German Democratic Republic (DDR).

== Life ==
Born in Burgstädt, Pfundt grew up with weekly Kurrende singing and lessons in piano and organ. He received first composition lessons from 1967 to 1969 with Paul Kurzbach in Chemnitz (then Karl-Marx-Stadt). From 1969 to 1975, he studied composition and piano at the Musikhochschule Leipzig, among others with Fritz Geißler, Rolf Reuter, Siegfried Thiele and Wilhelm Weismann. Afterwards he was master student of Siegfried Matthus at the Berlin Academy of Arts.

Pfundt worked as a freelance composer and pianist until 1987, and simultaneously lectured at Musikhochschule Leipzig and in Halle. He then became senior assistant (Oberassistent) in Leipzig. His De profundis was premiered in 1981 for the opening weeks of the new Gewandhaus, conducted by Kurt Masur. In 1992, Pfundt was appointed professor of composition and Tonsatz at the institution, now called University of Music and Theatre "Felix Mendelssohn Bartholdy". He served as Prorector of the university from 1994 to 2000. He retired in 2016.

== Awards ==
- 1978 Prize at the DDR Musiktage festival, for Sonata for viola solo
- 1980 Hans Stieber Prize.
- 1984 Hanns-Eisler-Preis for Bartók-Reflexionen für Orchester.
- 1986 Hanns-Eisler-Preis for Inventionen zu BACH. 1985
- 1985 Prize of the Thüringer Landeskirche.
- 1992 Prize of the Carl-Engels-Stiftung.

== Composition ==
Pfundt composed orchestral works, chamber music and songs, including:

=== Orchestra ===
- Bartók-Reflexionen
- De profundis
- Introduktion und Kanon
- Inventionen zu BACH
- Flute Concerto
- Concerto for orchestra
- Musique pour Sanssouci

=== Chamber music ===
- Auf der Suche nach dem Gleichgewicht for flute, violin and piano
- Ballade für Violine und Harfe.
- Wind Quiotet
- Capriccio, Canto e Canone for flute and clarinet
- Three Etudes for piano
- Three Pieces for horn
- Three Pieces for oboe and viola.
- Three Pieces for oboe and percussion.
- Three pieces for violin and piano
- Fantasia on Luther's Agnus Dei for organ
- Five Pieces for piano
- In die Tiefe, Collage for soprano recorder, violin, cello, double bass and harpsichord
- Inventions on B-A-C-H for piano
- Serenade for flute, alto flute (or violin) and cello.
- Sextett for flute, clarinet, bassoon, violin, viola and cello
- Sonate for viola sola
- Four String Quartets
- Suite for three flute instruments
- Trio for flute, viola and cello
- Triosonata for organ
- Vertiefung in ein Thema von Bach for flute, two violins, cello, double bass and harpsichord
- Four Pieces for piano
- Four Monograms for alto recorder

=== Vocal music ===
- Five songs for mezzo-soprano, horn and piano, text by Eva Strittmatter
- Nine Galgenlieder, songs for mixed choir, text by Christian Morgenstern
- Seven songs for mezzo-soprano, flute and harp, text by Morgenstern
- Two songs for voice and piano, text by Friedrich Hagedorn
- Two madrigals for mixed choir, texts by Paul von der Aelst and Thibault
