= Siegfried Thiele =

German composer (1934–2024)

- Thiele in the 1980s
- Born: 28 March 1934; Chemnitz, Gau Saxony, Germany
- Died: 24 November 2024 (aged 90); Leipzig, Saxony, Germany
- Education: Georgius-Agricola-Gymnasium Chemnitz; University of Music and Theatre Leipzig
- Occupations: Composer; rector
- Awards: Kunstpreis des FDGB für Musik; Kunstpreis der Stadt Leipzig; Art Prize of the German Democratic Republic; Order of Merit of the Free State of Saxony

Siegfried Thiele (German pronunciation: [ˈziːkfʁiːt ˈtiːlə]; 28 March 1934 – 24 November 2024) was a German composer. From 1990 to 1997, he was rector of the University of Music and Theatre Leipzig where he had begun teaching in 1962. He composed an extended work for soloists, choir and orchestra for the opening of the new Leipzig Gewandhaus in 1981, which was conducted by Kurt Masur.

== Life and career ==
Thiele was born in Chemnitz on 28 March 1934, the son of a craftsman. He created his first compositions at age twelve. He had music lessons with Werner Hübschmann and Gustav William Meyer and took part in the studio choir of the Volksbühne Chemnitz, directed by Paul Kurzbach.

After his Abitur in 1952 at the Georgius-Agricola-Gymnasium Chemnitz Thiele studied musical composition with Wilhelm Weismann and Johannes Weyrauch from 1953 to 1958, conducting with Franz Jung and Heinz Rögner and piano with Rudolf Fischer and Amadeus Webersinke at the Staatliche Hochschule für Musik – Mendelssohn-Akademie. From 1958 to 1962 he was teacher as well as choir and orchestra conductor at the music schools in Radeberg and Wurzen. From 1959 he performed his chamber music, symphonic and choral symphonic works at home and abroad. Since then he was also active in the Leipzig congregation of The Christian Community as a musician and composer for liturgical and other works.

From 1960 to 1962 Thiele studied composition further with Leo Spies at the Academy of Arts, Berlin. In 1962 he began teaching composition and score playing at the Hochschule für Musik und Theater "Felix Mendelssohn Bartholdy" Leipzig. He founded the Leipzig Youth Symphony Orchestra in 1963, directing it until 1978. From 1971 he was a lecturer and from 1984 professor) for composition at the University of Music and Theatre, retiring in 1999. Among his students were Bernd Franke, Walter Thomas Heyn, Thomas Reuter, Reinhard Pfundt and Steffen Schleiermacher.

For the occasion of the opening of the new Gewandhaus on 8 October 1981, Thiele created an extended work on a commission, Gesänge an die Sonne for alto and tenor solo, organ, choir and orchestra. It was premiered in the opening concert conducted by the kapellmeister Kurt Masur, who wanted the new large organ of the house to be appropriately use in this composition. Thiele took the texts from the Prolog im Himmel from Goethe's Faust, Schiller's poem "An die Sonne" and Hölderlin's "Dem Sonnengott". Masur had to intervene to make the performance possible, because the committee of the ruling SED did not like the texts.

On 1 October 1990, after German reunification, Thiele was elected rector of the University of Music and Theatre Leipzig. He was re-elected in this function for a second term, until 1997. He taught until 2004, described as a passionate, generous and inspiring teacher.

Thiele was a member of the Freie Akademie der Künste zu Leipzig from 1992, and from 1996 of the Sächsische Akademie der Künste in Dresden. In 1999 he was guest of honour at the Villa Massimo in Rome. In 2001 he was appointed Honorary Senator of the University of Music and Theatre Leipzig.

Thiele died in Leipzig on 24 November 2024, at the age of 90.

== Awards ==
- 1966: Kunstpreis des FDGB für Musik
- 1979: Kunstpreis der Stadt Leipzig
- 1983: Art Prize of the German Democratic Republic
- 2002: Order of Merit of the Free State of Saxony of the Freistaat Sachsen
