= Thomas Reuter =

German classical pianist

Thomas Reuter (born 20 January 1952) is a German composer, choral conductor, and a pianist focused on free improvisation.

== Life ==
Reuter was born in Eisenach in 1952, the son of the conductor Rolf Reuter and the singer Anemone Rau. In his childhood he received piano and violin lessons. After the Abitur at the St. Thomas School, Leipzig he studied music at the Musikhochschule Leipzig from 1970 to 1976. His teachers included Fritz Geißler and Siegfried Thiele in composition, Hans Volger in piano and Rolf Reuter in conducting. He received further inspiration from the composer and priest Lothar Reubke and took private singing lessons in Dresden.

He then worked as a lecturer for choir, music theory, composition and improvisation at the Spezialschule für Musik in Halle/Saale. He composed works for the Staatskapelle Dresden and the Dresden Philharmonic, and chamber music. His pieces were performed in the GDR and in the so-called Eastern Bloc. In 1989, his father conducted the orchestra of the Komische Oper in the premiere of the Cello Concerto, with soloist Jan Vogler, as part of the Berliner Festtage festival. He was awarded music prizes in the GDR.

In 1977, Reuter co-founded the Gruppe Freie Musik Dresden. He was active as an improvisor in many ways. From 1998 to 2011 he formed IndiviDuo with the violinist Rike Kohlhepp. In 2003 both formed the nu ART trio (a wordplay of "new art") with saxophonist Andreas Krennerich. In 2008 he formed PLASMA 8 with Krennerich. In 2012, he formed the Selbander duo with the singer Angelica Remlinger. In 2013 he formed the trio jo.Feuerbach with Remlinger and Krennerich. Reuter is also conductor of the women's chamber choir vocaLumen in Hannover creating settings of several poems by Paul Celan for them. He is also active in The Christian Community.

== Awards ==
- 1986: Hans Stieber Prize.
- 1990: Handel Prize

== Compositions ==
Reuter's work is published among others by Edition Peters and the Verlag Neue Musik.

- Wandlungen (1980) for flute, string trio and piano
- Stufen (1982/83) for flute, viola and cello
- Zeitspiele (1983) for piano
- Wind quintet (1984/85)
- String quartet (1985/86)
- Hälfte des Lebens (1986) for soprano, oboe, violin, violoncello and pianotsch National Bibliothek

List of compositions by Thomas Reuter on Deutsche Nationalbibliothek.

== Literature ==
- Walter Thomas Heyn: "In einem kleinen Land der Ordnung und Sicherheit. Junge Komponisten der DDR und ihre Musik." In MusikTexte 8 (1990) 33/34, pp. 44–50.
