= Karl Zumpe =

German opera director (1924–2001)

Karl Zumpe (20 May 1924 – 15 November 2001) was a German musician and long-time director of the Gewandhaus Leipzig.

== Life ==
Zumpe was born in Zwickau. After passing the Notabitur, Zumpe was drafted into military service at the age of eighteen. After serving on both the East and the West Front, he was a prisoner of war until 1948. After a period as a warehouse worker, he was employed as a librarian at Wismut in Johanngeorgenstadt. Equipped only with his experiences as a child in the choir of the Katharinenkirche in Zwickau, he took over as choir director in the cultural ensemble of Wismut. It was here that Rudolf Fischer of the Leipzig Musikhochschule discovered him at a choir competition and brought him to Leipzig to study.

After studying music from 1951 to 1956, he obtained a position at the Leipzig Gewandhaus in 1958 as head of the Gewandhaus office. This position was changed to that of Gewandhaus director in 1960. While the Gewandhauskapellmeister was responsible for artistic and state direction, the Gewandhausdirektor was responsible for organisation and administration. He was able to dispel initial reservations of the orchestra - Zumpe had joined the SED during his studies - through good performance and commitment to the orchestra.

After Vaclav Neumann's departure from the Gewandhaus Orchestra in 1968, the function of an artistic director equal to the Kapellmeister was introduced, and Zumpe became "commissioner for the new building of the Gewandhaus". In the early 1970s, however, the Gewandhaus Kapellmeister Kurt Masur restored the old conditions.

Under Zumpe's tenure, the various concert series and forms, some of which still exist today, were introduced, as were the annual visitor debates before each new season.

He summarised the history of the Gewandhaus and its activities in his two-volume dissertation, on the basis of which he was awarded a doctorate in 1981. In 1984, Zumpe received the Kunstpreis der Stadt Leipzig. In 1989, he had to resign as director of the Gewandhaus for health reasons. In his tenure over a period of 41 years, Zumpe exercised his office under the conductors Konwitschny, Neumann and Masur.

Kempe died in Leipzig aged 77.

== Publications ==
- Die Geschichte des Gewandhausorchesters und die Probleme bei der Entwicklung des Klangkörpers zu einem führenden sozialistischen Musikinstitut der Deutschen Demokratischen Republik. Dissertationsschrift 1981
- Res severa est verum gaudium. Gewandhaus zu Leipzig. Gewandhausanekdoten. Leipzig. VOB Buch- und Offsetdruck, 1987.
- Kurt Masur – Gewandhauskapellmeister Leipzig. Ullstein, Frankfurt, Berlin, 1990
