= Volkmar Leimert =

German composer

Volkmar Leimert (born 31 January 1940) is a German composer and dramaturg.

== Life ==
Born in Berlin, Leimert graduated from EOS „Johann-Wolfgang-von-Goethe“ in Karl-Marx-Stadt in 1957. He took private music lessons with Gustav William Meyer in Grüna. He then worked as a stock clerk. From 1959 to 1964, he studied musical composition with Ottmar Gerster, Wilhelm Weismann and Carlernst Ortwein at the Leipziger Musikhochschule. After passing the Staatsexamen he wrked as an Aspirant in Leipzig (1964 to 1967). He then became a music dramaturg at the Opernhaus Chemnitz.. He retired in 2005.

He is a member of the Lions Clubs International Chemnitz und im Sächsischer Musikbund. He is also the secretary of the Chemnitz chapter of the International Association of Wagner Societies. In 2008, Leimert participated in the joint exhibition Richard Wagner-Episode X organized by the Leipzig Association of Visual Artists and the Saxon Music Federation at the Stadtgeschichtliches Museum Leipzig mit. His works are published by, among others, Verlag Neue Musik in Berlin.

== Compositions ==
- Passacaglia für großes Orchester, Pauken und Schlagzeug (1963)
- Sonate für Horn und Klavier (1964)
- Liedmotette „Die Sonne, die ist verblichen“ für 4/5-stimmigen gemischten Chor (1964)
- Streichquartett (1964)
- Drei Madrigale nach Texten von Johannes R. Becher für fünfstimmigen gemischten Chor a cappella (1965)
- Streichquartett II (1973)
- Pentagramm für Orchester (1974)
- Fünf Orchesterlieder after texts by Franz Fühmann for baritone and orchestra (1977)
- Konzert für Violoncello und Orchester (1980) – Auftragswerk des Theaters der Stadt Plauen zu den Robert-Schumann-Tagen des Bezirkes Karl-Marx-Stadt
- Goethe-Lieder für Bariton und Orchester (1982)
- Sextett für Flöte, Klarinette. Violine, Viola, Violoncello und Klavier (1982)
- Concertino für Flöte, Oboe und Streicher (1987)
- Marginalien zu Schumann (1987)

== Publications ==
- 70 Jahre Opernhaus Karl-Marx-Stadt In Musik und Gesellschaft, 29, 1979, p. 13–616.
- 44. Deutsches Mozartfest. 27.5.–4.6.95. Festschrift und Programm, Chemnitz 1995.
- Zur Chemnitzer Tannhäuser-Konzeption. In Udo Bermbach (ed.): Individuum versus Institution. Zur Urfassung von Richard Wagner's Tannhäuser (1845). Leipziger Univ.-Verlag, Leipzig 1996, ISBN 3-931922-25-1, pp. 77–81 (Kulturelle Infrastruktur, vol. 7)
- Zum Libretto der Urfassung. In: Udo Bermbach (Hrsg.): Individuum versus Institution. Zur Urfassung von Richard Wagners „Tannhäuser“ (1845). Leipziger Univ.-Verlag, Leipzig 1996, ISBN 3-931922-25-1, pp. 83–93 (Kulturelle Infrastruktur, volume 7)
- 90 Jahre Opernhaus Chemnitz. 1909–1999. Städtisches Theater, Chemnitz 1999.
- 100 Jahre Opernhaus Chemnitz. 18 Blätter zur Geschichte des Opernhauses. Städtisches Theater, Chemnitz 2009.

== Filmography ==
- 1982: Der Maler Albert Ebert 1906 – 1976 (music and script)
