= Werner Felix =

German music historian

Werner Felix (30 July 1927 – 24 September 1998) was a German music historian and Bach scholar. He was rector of the Hochschule für Musik Franz Liszt, Weimar and the University of Music and Theatre Leipzig as well as president of the Chopin-Gesellschaft of the DDR.

== Life ==
Felix was born in 1927 as the son of a merchant in Weißenfels. He initially learned the trade of a merchant himself. In 1950, he began a scholar music at the Hochschule für Musik Franz Liszt, Weimar, which he completed in 1951 with the Staatsexamen.

In 1951/52, he was chief advisor in the Ministerium für das Hoch- und Fachschulwesen der DDR. From 1952 to 1954, he was director of the Erfurt Conservatory. From 1955 to 1966, he succeeded Willi Niggeling, who was "increasingly at odds with the cultural policy of the SED", Rector of the Musikhochschule in Weimar. In 1956, he was awarded a doctorate in music education by Fritz Reuter at the Faculty of Education of the Humboldt University of Berlin with the dissertation Ernst Julius Hentschel (1804 to 1875). He then received a lectureship in music history in Weimar. In 1959 he was appointed professor. In 1960, he founded the annual "International Music Seminar for Composition and Interpretation" in Weimar. In 1965 he became a full professor of music history at the Staatliche Hochschule für Musik – Mendelssohn-Akademie in Leipzig. In 1968, he was appointed Intendanten of the Gewandhaus orchestra Leipzig by the Leipzig City Council (until 1971). From 1987 to 1990 he served as rector and thus successor to Peter Herrmann at the Academy of Music "Felix Mendelssohn Bartholdy" Leipzig.

From 1962 to 1986 he was founding president of the Chopin Society of the GDR and corresponding member of the Chopin Society in Warsaw. Felix was a member of the Executive Council of the Music Council of the GDR and of the Central Board of the Association of Composers and Musicologists of the GDR. From 1969 to 1990 he was an executive board member of the Neue Bachgesellschaft in Leipzig. In 1976 he became president of the Debussy Circle of the GDR. From 1979 to 1991 he acted as general director of the "National Research and Memorial Centre Johann Sebastian Bach of the GDR". Thus he also presided over the incorporated Bach Archive Leipzig. From 1978 to 1998 he was a member of the editorial board of the New Bach Edition. In 1985 he became a full member of the Philological-Historical Class of the Saxon Academy of Sciences at Leipzig.

Felix was a member of the SED and a member of parliament for the Bezirk Erfurt from 1958 to 1963.

Felix died in Leipzig at the age of 71.

== Awards ==
- 1964: Verdienstmedaille der DDR
- 1965: Ehrennadel der Gesellschaft für Deutsch-Sowjetische Freundschaft in Gold
- 1976: Art Prize of the German Democratic Republic
- 1977: Patriotic Order of Merit in Bronze

== Publications ==
- Die Musik der deutschen Klassik (Studienmaterial zum organisierten Selbststudium für Kulturfunktionäre. Issue 4). Seemann, Leipzig 1954.
- Franz Liszt. Ein Lebensbild. Mit Auszügen aus Schriften und Briefen des Komponisten im Anhang (Reclams Universal-Bibliothek. Nr. 8995/97). Reclam, Leipzig 1961 (2nd edition 1961).
- Christoph Willibald Gluck (Reclams Universal-Bibliothek. Vol. 165). Reclam, Leipzig 1965.
- Franz Liszt. [Biografie] (Reclams Universal-Bibliothek. Vol. 399). Reclam, Leipzig 1969 (2. veränderte Auflage 1986; auch erschienen in Frankfurt: Röderberg-Verlag 1986).
- Mit Winfried Hoffmann, Armin Schneiderheinze (ed.): Bericht über die wissenschaftliche Konferenz zum III. [Dritten] Internationalen Bach-Fest der DDR. Leipzig, 18./19. September 1975. Im Auftrag des Johann-Sebastian-Bach-Komitees der DDR, Deutscher Verlag für Musik VEB, Leipzig 1977.
- Johann Sebastian Bach. Deutscher Verlag für Musik, Leipzig 1984 (2nd edition 1986 and 3rd edition 1989, ISBN 3-370-00165-9; als Lizenzausgabe erschienen in Wiesbaden: Breitkopf und Härtel 1984, ISBN 3-7651-0202-4).
- Musikgeschichte. Ein Grundriss. Deutscher Verlag für Musik, Leipzig 1984/85, ISBN 3-370-00006-7 (2nd edition 1989/90).
