= Gustav Schmahl =

German violinist and music educator

Gustav Schmahl (29 November 1929 – 4 October 2003) was a German violinist and university lecturer. He was the only student of David Oistrach from the GDR. Schmahl worked at times as concertmaster of the Rundfunk-Sinfonieorchester Berlin and from 1973 to 1984 as rector of the University of Music and Theatre Leipzig.

== Life ==
Schmahl was born in 1929 in Herford (Westphalia) the son of a violinist and grew up in Berlin. He received his first violin lessons at the age of seven. In his parental home Hausmusik was cultivated, the concerts of the Berlin Philharmonic and the Sing-Akademie zu Berlin had a formative effect on the young Schmahl. After attending secondary school and passing his Abitur in 1949, he studied for two semesters with the violin virtuoso Max Strub at the Hochschule für Musik Detmold.

After the founding of the GDR he moved to Gustav Havemann at the Hochschule für Musik "Hanns Eisler" in East Berlin in 1950. The influential composer Hanns Eisler was also one of his teachers there. In 1950, he was a prize winner of a competition of the FDJ and in 1951 he qualified for the III World Festival of Youth and Students in East Berlin. A study visit led him as the only violinist from the GDR to the Soviet pedagogue and virtuoso David Oistrach at the Moscow Conservatory. In 1953, he was a prize winner of an international music competition in Bucharest (Romania). Later (1962), he took part in the violin category at the second International Tchaikovsky Competition in Moscow.

Schmahl, who had joined the Socialist Unity Party of Germany in the GDR, became the first concertmaster of the Rundfunk-Sinfonieorchester Berlin. Concert tours took him around the world as far as the US, and he repeatedly gave concerts in Italy and the Soviet Union. He performed with the most important orchestras of the GDR among others the Leipzig Gewandhaus Orchestra and the Rundfunk-Sinfonieorchester Leipzig, the Dresdner Staatskapelle and the Dresdner Philharmonie as well as the Berliner Sinfonie-Orchester. He also played together with the Händelfestspielorchester Halle. He had encounters with renowned conductors of those years such as Franz Konwitschny, Kurt Sanderling and Kurt Masur. Schmahl also championed Neue Musik by GDR composers, for example, he repeatedly performed Ernst Hermann Meyer's concerto of 1963/64 and was responsible for the premiere of the first two violin concertos (1963 and 1973) by Gerhard Rosenfeld in Dresden. In 1982, followed Siegfried Köhler's Violin Concerto. He played chamber music among others works by Igor Stravinsky, Dmitri Shostakovich, Sergei Prokofiev and Hans Werner Henze. Together with Hugo Steurer (piano) and Clemens Dillner (violoncello), he appeared with the Arte-Trio since 1956.

In 1963, Schmahl took on a teaching position and in 1970 a full-time lectureship at the Hochschule für Musik Carl Maria von Weber. In 1971, he became professor for violin and head of a master class. In 1973, he moved to Leipzig, where from 1973 to 1984 he was Rudolf Fischer's successor as rector of the University of Music and Theatre Leipzig. Later, he was responsible for all master classes at the Hochschule für Musik "Hanns Eisler" in Berlin. Among his master students were among others Heike Janicke, Torsten Janicke, Ralf-Carsten Brömsel, Conrad Muck and Wolfgang Hentrich.

In 1971, he was elected to the board of the international Georg-Friedrich-Händel-Gesellschaft. In 1977, he was a member of the committee for the Beethoven Honour of the GDR. He was also a member of the committee of the Verband der Komponisten und Musikwissenschaftler der DDR. As a juror, he participated in the International Johann Sebastian Bach Competition in Leipzig.

Schmahl lived in Zehlendorf during his studies and moved with his family to Kleinmachnow in the GDR only in 1957. After the political turnaround he founded a taxi company. In 2003, Schmahl died in Caputh at the age of 73 in the Schwielowsee community in Landkreis Potsdam-Mittelmark.

== Family ==
The writer and journalist Martin Ahrends (born 1951), who took his wife's name when he married, and the trumpeter Daniel Schmahl (born 1969) are his sons. An Ausreiseantrag (application for departure) by Ahrends to the Federal Republic of Germany was granted in 1984. In Hamburg, he worked as an editor for the weekly newspaper Die Zeit. Like other musicians, Schmahl was in contact with the former German Chancellor and Zeit publisher Helmut Schmidt and his wife Loki Schmidt at Brahmsee.

== Awards ==
- 1959: Kunstpreis der DDR
- 1968: Nationalpreis der DDR, III. Klasse für Kunst und Literatur.
- 1976: Handel Prize.
- 1979: Vaterländischer Verdienstorden in Bronze
- 1981: Nationalpreis der DDR, II. Klasse für Kunst und Literatur
- 1984: Ehrennadel der Karl-Marx-Universität Leipzig.
- 1989: Vaterländischer Verdienstorden in Silver.
