= Walter Thomas Heyn =

German composer and literary editor

Walter Thomas Heyn (born 14 November 1953) is a German guitarist, composer and music producer.

== Life ==
Born in Görlitz, Heyn was initially musically self-taught. From the age of fourteen he played guitar and performed in singing clubs. From 1974 to 1980 he studied guitar with Thomas Buhé and Roland Zimmer, arrangement with Gerd Schlotter and music composition with Carlernst Ortwein at the University of Music and Theatre Leipzig. His composition teacher recommended him for the class of Siegfried Thiele. Heyn was then Meisterschüler for composition with Siegfried Matthus at the Academy of Arts, Berlin in (East) Berlin from 1985 to 1987. He was also a research assistant for composition at the Leipzig Academy of Music until 1984.

He took part in events of the Deutscher Verlag für Musik and the Leipzig district association of the composers' association. From 1988 on he worked without a fixed contract and published the handbook Guitar-Harmonics at Harth Musik Verlag in Leipzig in 1989. He appeared as Liedbegleiter and chamber musician and played on cabaret stages. Heyn received in this time among others composition commissions from private stage music. His works Concerto grosso Nr. 1 op. 18 for 5 soloists and orchestra (1984) and Concerto grosso Nr. 2 op. 20 for 2 violins and orchestra (1987) were premiered by the Leipzig Gewandhaus orchestra under the direction of Kurt Masur. In 1990 he was one of the founders of the International Children's Music Centre Leipzig.

Heyn was a member of the board of directors of the Verband der Komponisten und Musikwissenschaftler der DDR and since 1994 he has headed the Verein der Komponisten und Musikwissenschaftler (VKM e.V.). In 1991 he moved to Berlin. He bought the Verlag Neue Musik, whose chief editor he was from 1991 to 1999. In 2000 then acquired the AMA Verlag the specialist publishing house for contemporary music. In 1996, he founded the record label Kreuzberg Records and appeared as music producer. Heyn founded the Theatergruppe FSV Offenbach, which performed in Saalbau Neukölln. He also founded the ensembles Kammerorchester Berlin and the Quintetto con brio. He is head of the music section of the Künstlergilde Esslingen and chairman of the supporters' association of the Musikgymnasium Carl Philipp Emanuel Bach.

Heyn received several awards, including the Hanns Eisler Prize for "3 Yiddish songs". He participated in radio (Deutschlandradio, RBB and MDR) and CD productions with the participation of Claus Peter Flor, Rosemarie Lang, Dieter Mann, Kurt Masur, Horst Neumann, Max Pommer, Friedrich Schenker and Gerhard Schöne.

== Work ==
In the 80s, Heyn devoted himself to opera, theatre music and song. His first composition Four aphoristic songs (1980) was presented on a composer portrait at the Academy of Arts Berlin. In his works he worked on, among others. texts by Anna Akhmatova, Agostinho Neto and Andreas Reimann. His sound creations prove to be time-critical and cynical. For the Gruppe Neue Musik Hanns Eisler he composed Ich ist ein anderer. Rimbaud. From 1989 he concentrated on chamber music. In the late 90s, compositions in the field of literature & music followed. He worked together with the chanson singer Barbara Kellerbauer. Heyn composes in all styles from Romantique to New Music. He is also an arranger of the works of Johann Sebastian Bach, Claudio Monteverdi, Modest Mussorgsky and Dmitri Shostakovich.

== Scholarships, prizes and awards ==
- Mendelssohn Scholarship of the Ministerium für Kultur of the DDR (1977/78 and 1978/79)
- Erich-Weinert-Medaille (1984)
- Hanns Eisler Prize of the Rundfunk der DDR (1987)
- Scholarship of the Körber Foundation Hamburg (1991/93)

== Discography ==
- 1996: Gitarra poetica (Kreuzberg Records)
- 1997: Nicht jeder Abschied macht klein (Mara Records)
- 1997: ZooMusik – MusikZoo (Kreuzberg Records)
- 1998: Hommage à Alfred Berghorn (Kreuzberg Records)
- 2000: Liebsamen Beschäftigung (Kreuzburg Records)
- 2000: Bach meets Schostakowitsch (Kreuzberg Records)
- 2000: Freimaurer Gesänge (Kreuzberg Records)
- 2001: Opus (Kreuzberg Records)
- 2001: Leipziger Legende (Kreuzberg Records)
- 2002: Florestan-Quartett (Kreuzberg Records)
- 2002: Missae sine Verbis (Kreuzberg Records)
- 2002: Lebensgruß (Kreuzberg Records)
- 2003: Passionen (Kreuzberg Records)

== Literature ==
- Hermann Neef: Der Beitrag der Komponisten Friedrich Goldmann, Friedrich Schenker, Paul-Heinz Dittrich und Thomas Heyn zur ästhetischen Diskussion der Gattung Oper in der DDR seit 1977. Dissertation, Halle 1989
- Ulrike Liedtke: Walter Thomas Heyn. In Komponisten der Gegenwart (KDG). Edition Text & Kritik, Munich 1996, ISBN 978-3-86916-164-8.
- Heyn, Thomas. In Brockhaus, Riemann Musiklexikon. CD-Rom, Directmedia Publishing, Berlin 2004, ISBN 3-89853-438-3, p. 12793.
- Heyn, Walter Thomas. In Axel Schniederjürgen (ed.): Kürschners Musiker-Handbuch. 5th edition, Saur Verlag, Munich 2006, ISBN 3-598-24212-3, p. 184.
