= Carlernst Ortwein =

German classical pianist and composer

Carlernst Ortwein, pseudonym Conny Odd, (21 December 1916 – 22 December 1986) was a German classical pianist and composer.

== Life ==
Ortwein was born in 1916 in Leipzig as the son of the music teacher Karl Ortwein. From 1927 he was a member of the Thomanerchor. After he passed the Abitur at the Thomasschule zu Leipzig followed studies at the Kirchenmusikalischen Institut of the Hochschule für Musik und Theater Leipzig: organ with Karl Straube, piano with Carl Adolf Martienssen and Robert Teichmüller as well as musical composition with Kurt Thomas, Günter Raphael and Johann Nepomuk David.

For helping his "half-Jew" teacher Günter Raphael, after his dismissal from the university, Ortwein also had to leave. He continued his private studies. From 1937 he began a pianistic activity at German radio stations. During this time he also wrote his first compositions. From 1939 to 1945 he was called up for military service. After further activities as a pianist, he was head of the serious music department at the Leipzig radio station from 1947 to 1949. As there was a lack of entertainment compositions at the station, he began to compose in this field and took the pseudonym Conny Odd.

From 1950 to 1953 he was a freelance artist. From 1953 to 1961 he was a lecturer at the Music Pedagogical Institute of the Karl-Marx-University Leipzig. In 1962 he received a lectureship for composition and instrumentation at the University of Music and Theatre Leipzig, where he became a professor in 1976.

Among his students were Volker Bräutigam, Michael Heubach, Walter Thomas Heyn, Karl Ottomar Treibmann, Volkmar Leimert and Rainer Lischka.

Ortwein wrote over 100 radio play scores, about 50 film scores, numerous chansons, choral songs and orchestral works. Of his light music, his "Vergnügliche Reisebekanntschaften eines Pianisten" from 1951 became best known. As Conny Odd, he was the most successful operetta composer of the GDR next to Gerd Natschinski, with some works having a musical theatre character.

In the DEFA film Geliebte weiße Maus from 1964, for which he wrote the music, he also appeared as pianist of the dance orchestra.

Ortwein died in Leipzig at the age of 70.

== Prizes ==
- Kunstpreis der DDR (1964)
- Kunstpreis der Stadt Leipzig (1968)
- Kunstpreis des FDGB in collective with the stages of the city of Gera (1971)
- Kunstpreis des Deutscher Turn- und Sportbund (1977)

== Instrumental music ==
with year and place of the premiere

- Zum Glück hat sie Pech, 1955, Volkstheater Rostock
- Alarm in Point l'Évêque, 1958, Städtische Bühnen Erfurt, bearbeitet Gangster lieben keine Blumen, 1974, Metropoltheater Berlin
- Hände hoch, Mister Copper!, 1962, Staatsoperette Dresden
- Irene und die Kapitäne, 1967, Staatsoperette Dresden
- Karambolage, 1969, Bühnen der Stadt Gera
- Man liest kein fremdes Tagebuch, 1974, Metropol-Theater (Berlin-Mitte)

== Filmography ==
- 1954: Der Teufel und der Drescher
- 1957: Die Zauberschere
- 1960: Alarm im Kasperletheater
- 1961: Das Stacheltier – Die Mutprobe
- 1961: Da helfen keine Pillen
- 1961: Das Rabauken-Kabarett
- 1963: Der Teufelstaler
- 1963: Miau'
- 1964: Wie Pumphut zu seinem Namen kam
- 1964: Aprikosenbäumchen
- 1964: Geliebte weiße Maus
- 1965: Der fliegende Großvater
- 1966: Steinzeitlegende
- 1966: Der gestiefelte Kater
- 1968: Die sieben Raben
- 1970: Der Teufel aus der Flasche
- 1979: Stern und Blume
- 1983: Erlebte Träume

== Radio plays music ==
- 1952: Howard Fast: 30 Silberlinge – Regie: Günther Rücker (Berliner Rundfunk)
- 1953: Konstantin Trenjow: Ljubow Jarowaja – Regie: Günter Rücker (Berliner Rundfunk)
- 1958: Henrik Ibsen: Stützen der Gesellschaft – Regie: Erich-Alexander Winds (Rundfunk der DDR)
- 1964: Heinz von Cramer: Die Ohrfeige – Regie: Hans Knötzsch (Rundfunk der DDR)

== Literature ==
- Otto Schneidereit: Operette A – Z, Henschelverlag Kunst und Gesellschaft Berlin 1981, pp. 247–260
