= Karl Krug =

German painter

Karl Krug (10 October 1900 – 8 March 1983) was a German painter.

== Life and work ==
Born in Leipzig, After completing primary school, Krug did an apprenticeship as a mechanical draughtsman and operating technician from 1915 to 1918. In 1918, he was drafted for military service. After the end of the war, he worked as an operating technician. From 1921, he was a pupil at the state academy for graphic arts and book trade in Leipzig, and from 1923 to 1925, he was a day pupil at the academy's pre-school. From 1925 to 1931, he studied under Fritz Ernst Rentsch, Bruno Héroux, Alois Kolb, Paul Horst-Schulze and Hans Soltmann. He was a master student with Horst-Schulze.

From 1925, Krug went on study trips to Italy and Schleswig-Holstein, and from 1935 to 1939 to the Krkonoše Mountains, the Elbe Sandstone Mountains and the Curonian Spit. In 1927 he had a study visit to Glücksburg. He was able to get through financial lean times with the help of scholarships and support from patrons, including the Leipzig industrialist Jan Heini Möbius.

After initially wanting to become a sculptor, Krug soon became involved with the technique of copper engraving. His first surviving work, a coat of arms against the background of a landscape, is dated 1928. He then received further commissions, often depicting coats of arms and decorative, calligraphic and symbolic elements. From 1932, Krug worked freelance in Leipzig. In 1931, he was represented at the Great Leipzig Art Exhibition.

In 1939, Krug was drafted for military service and in 1941 was transferred to Norway, where he became a prisoner of war in 1945. The Norwegian years had a strong artistic influence on him. "The vast, sparse, deserted forests and Scandinavian lighting conditions appear repeatedly in his works. In addition to various pictorial works, prints and paintings that refer directly to the country in the title, it is also the reduction of the pictorial components and tranquillity in the pictorial space that make their mark on Krug's oeuvre."

In 1943, Krug's studio in Leipzig was destroyed in a bombing raid along with most of the artworks he had created up to that time. The 40 paintings and drawings he created in Norway and sent to Leipzig never arrived there.

Krug returned to Leipzig from Norwegian captivity in 1947. He initially found work as a workshop assistant for a Leipzig blacksmith. Artistically, he had to start anew. After 1946, he was a member of the collective for agit art, and from 1947 he worked freelance. From 1950 to 1965, Krug was senior assistant and lecturer for relief engraving and stamp cutting at the Hochschule für Grafik und Buchkunst Leipzig Leipzig and head of the workshop for etching and engraving. From 1952, he belonged to the Verband Bildender Künstler der DDR. From 1965, he worked in Leipzig as a freelance painter and graphic artist. The main motifs of his works from 1970 onwards were landscapes.

Krug was represented at the art exhibitions of the GDR in Dresden in 1962/1963, 1967/1968, 1972/1973, 1977/1978 and 1982/1983.

His students included Wolfgang Böttcher, Sighard Gille, Ulrich Hachulla, Bernhard Heisig, Reinhard Minkewitz, Michael Morgner, Gerhard Kurt Müller, Rolf Münzner, Gert Pötzschig, Thomas Ranft, Peter Schnürpel and Volker Stelzmann.

Krug died in Leipzig at the age of 82.

The Leipziger Grafikbörse association awards the annual "Karl-Krug-Preis für Druckgrafik".

== Reception ==
"...a capable etcher and painter, a landscapist who, for all the almost chiselled precision of his art, knew how to spread the magic of light and atmosphere over the objects of his depiction..."

"The increasingly monochrome design of his paintings, typical of Krug, ultimately achieved its full effect in the graphic art. In his late work, it is particularly evident in the graphics that Krug, with his increasing mastery of the material, also gained the possibility to work more abstractly without depriving the motif, often the Leipzig countryside, of its naturalness. Elements from nature are repeated, such as trees, hills, rivers, which he elaborated in different constellations as a final work."

== Work (selection) ==
=== Panel pictures (selection) ===
- Waldweg im Winter (oil, 1932; in the collection of the Lindenau-Museum Altenburg/Thüringen).
- Rote Häuser (Öl, 1952; 1953 ausgestellt auf der Dritten Deutschen Kunstausstellung in Dresden)
- Erinnerung an Norwegen (Öl; 1962/1963 ausgestellt auf der Fünften Deutschen Kunstausstellung in Dresden)
- Könneritz mit Brücke (Öl, 1966; 1967/1968 ausgestellt auf der VI. Deutschen Kunstausstellung in Dresden)
- Tümpel im Winter (Öl, 1970; 1972/1973 ausgestellt auf der VII. Kunstausstellung der DDR)
- Aus Norwegen (Öl, 1977; 1977/1978 ausgestellt auf der VIII. Kunstausstellung der DDR)
- Tümpel im Herbst (Öl, 1979; im Bestand der Dresdener Gemäldegalerie Neue Meister)
- Am Weiher (Öl, 1981; im Bestand der Berliner National Gallery)

=== Prints (selection) ===
- Aus Norwegen (Radierung, 1981; 1982/1983 ausgestellt auf der IX. Kunstausstellung der DDR).

== Exhibitions ==
- 1976: Leipzig, Galerie am Sachsenplatz (with Heinz Wagner)
- 1983: Leipzig, Museum der bildenden Künste
- 1986: Leipzig, Galerie am Sachsenplatz, Leipzig
- 2010: Leipzig, Galerie am Sachsenplatz, Leipzig
- 2017: Panitzsch, Kirche Panitzsch (Landschaftsgrafik)
- 2018: Leipzig, Galerie Irrgang (Karl Krug und die Folgen – "Was macht er den da?")

== Honours and scholarships ==
- 1930, 1933 and 1935 Ernst Keil Scholarship of the State Academy for Graphic Arts and Book Trade Leipzig
- 1975: Kunstpreis der Stadt Leipzig

== Collections ==
Further works by Krug are in the following collections:

- Eisenhüttenstadt: Städtisches Museum Eisenhüttenstadt
- Frankfurt (Oder): Städtische Museen Junge Kunst und Viadrina
- Jena: Kunstsammlung Städtische Museen
- Leipzig: Kunstsammlung der Universität Leipzig
- Leipzig: Museum der bildenden Künste
- Leipzig: Stadtgeschichtliches Museum Leipzig
- Neubrandenburg: Kunstsammlung Neubrandenburg
- Weimar: Klassik Stiftung Weimar
