= Peter Sylvester =

German painter

Peter Sylvester (3 March 1937 – 4 April 2007) was a German painter and graphic artist.

== Life ==
Sylvester was born in Saalfeld. After finishing primary school, he completed a skilled worker apprenticeship as a chemical engineer from 1951 to 1954. From 1954 to 1957, he worked in his profession in Erfurt and Jena and until 1964 also in Leipzig, where he moved in 1958.

The years 1955/56 saw his first attempts at painting, intensified not least by a visit to the studio of the painter Max Ackermann in Stuttgart. In Jena, Sylvester began self-taught studies at the university's Archaeological Institute and attended the Jena Art History Institute as a guest student. His painting education remained autodidactic. In Leipzig, he attended the evening academy of the Hochschule für Grafik und Buchkunst Leipzig and began his graphic work in its workshops for lithography and etching.

Since 1964 Peter Sylvester had been working as a freelance artist in Leipzig. In 1967 he became a member of the Bundesverband Bildender Künstlerinnen und Künstler (BBK) (from 1970 Verband Bildender Künstler der DDR). In 1972, together with other Leipzig artists, he founded the "Leipziger Grafikbörse" as the first jury-free and thus censorship-free artists' association in the former GDR, which held annual graphic exhibitions and is still active today. On the occasion of the 15th exhibition, Peter Sylvester became its director and, after its transformation into an association, was its chairman from 1991 until his death.

Study trips took him to Dalmatia, Central Asia, Italy and France, among other places. On a trip to France in 1981, he met Victor Vasarely in his country house in Gordes. This was followed in 1983, 1984 and 1985 by working stays as a guest in the Cité internationale des arts Paris and in Aix-en-Provence and Morlans/Mont Ventoux (Provence).

In 1993, he became a member of the Association du Chemin Vert-Atelier Gravure, Paris. In 1994, he participated in the symposium "Natural Science and Art" at the University of Leipzig. He also participated several times in the Gaterslebener Begegnungen, where natural scientists, writers, artists, publicists and politicians comment on philosophical questions from nature and society.

Peter Sylvester was awarded the medal of the V International Biennial of Graphic Arts Cracow in 1974. In 1987 he received the Kunstpreis der Stadt Leipzig.

== Style and theme ==
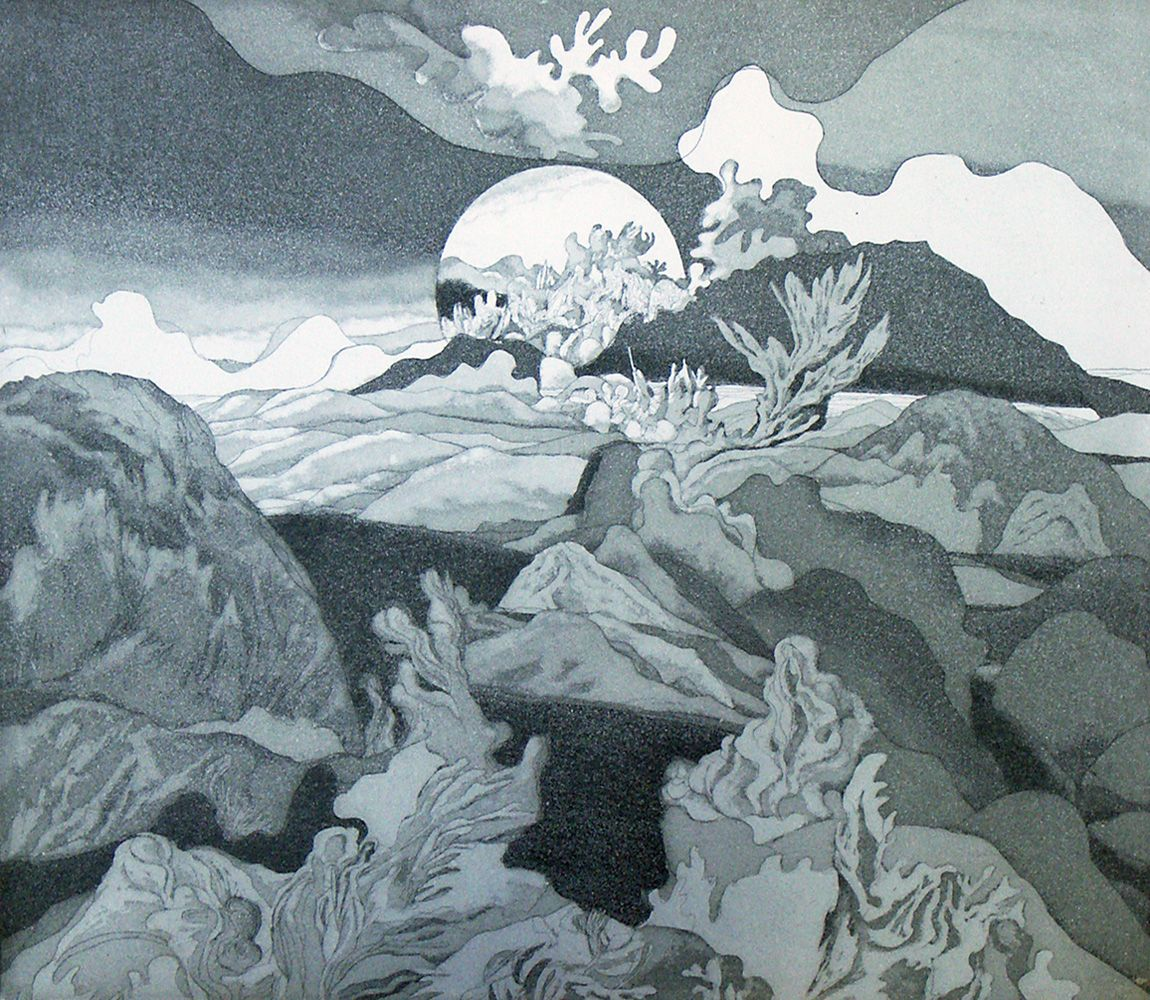
Graphic by Peter Sylvester on a stone slab on his grave

Sylvester first began with classical etching, eventually breaking down the surfaces into facets. Then he turned to serigraphy and developed it into a photomechanical printing technique in perfection. He was soon the serigrapher in the GDR.

He eventually also incorporated initially artless techniques into his instruments. From 1976 onwards, he used a device based on video technology, the densitron, developed at the Central Institute for Isotope and Radiation Research of the Academy of Sciences of the GDR for the evaluation of scientific images, in order to work on two-dimensional graphics such as aquatint, for example. In the case of two-dimensional originals, the densitron made it possible to introduce colours and to "play" with them experimentally. This was long before image processing by the personal computer. Eventually, he combined several of these techniques and arrived at his particular artistic expression.

Nature was at the centre of his work. But as early as 1965 he designed his first abstracted landscapes from architectural and landscape motifs. Similarities were also found with the surreal landscape forms of the battered nature of the overburden in the open-cast lignite mines of the southern Leipzig region. But the abstraction went beyond the earthly. In 1968, the first cosmic landscapes. More and more processes of the emergence and decay of fantastic landscapes were included. He himself said about this:

This is where my primal longing to move away from familiar landscapes to worlds that seem very alienating came together - to chaos landscapes where everything is in a tremendous flux, where there is something threatening above it, where one still senses nature in a small corner [...] - is this still a world of nature or a world to come or a past world ...?

— Peter Sylvester, Zwischen-Raum-Welten, Berlin 1991, Ralf-Michael Seele im Gespräch mit Peter Sylvester, zitiert in Lust und Last. (s.u.)

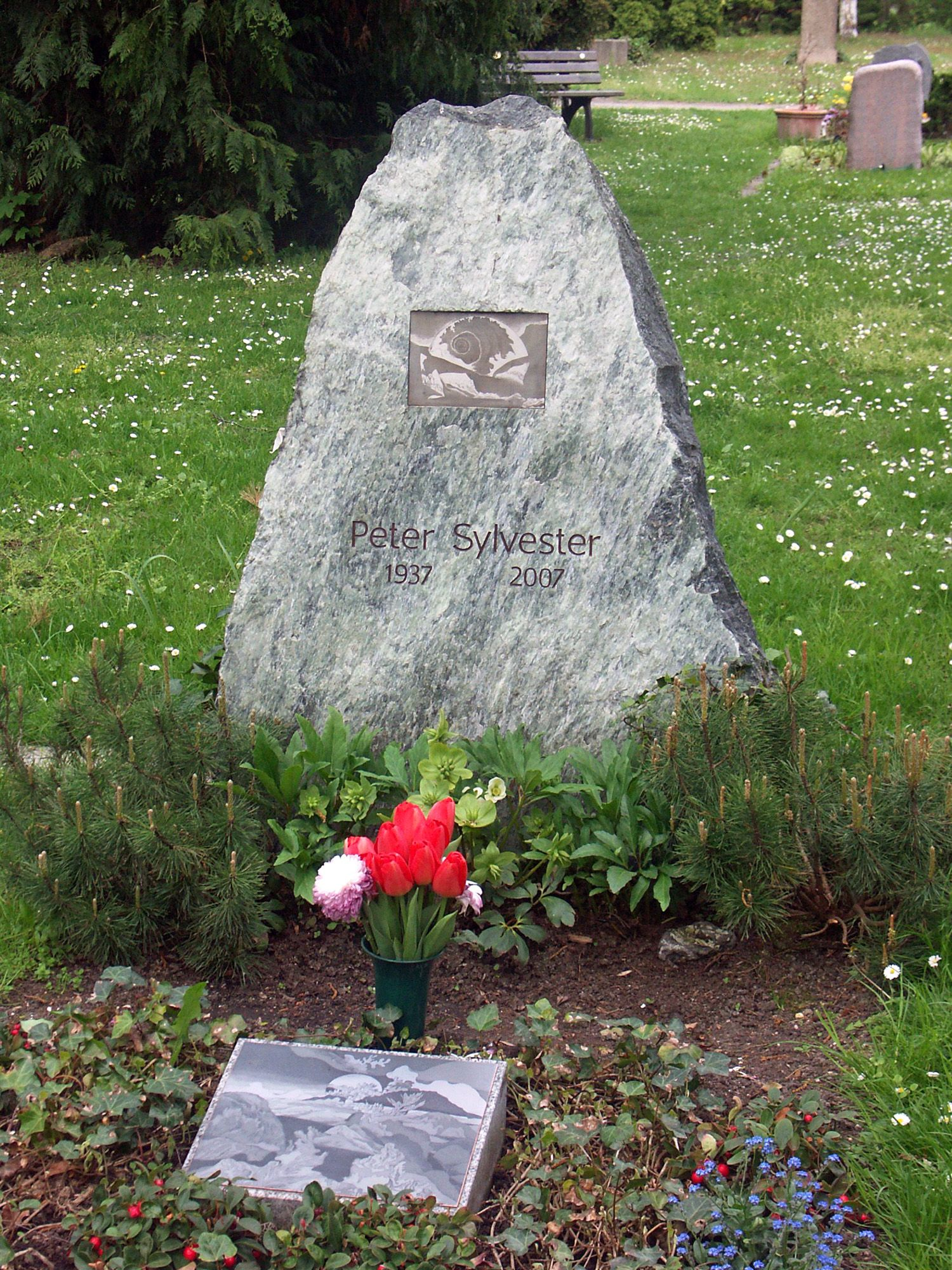
His grave at Leipzig South Cemetery

== Solo exhibitions (selection) ==
- Leipzig 1962 – Galerie Engewald,
- Stuttgart 1970 – Kunstkreis Leinfelden
- Altenburg 1980 – Lindenau-Museum
- Jena 1981 – Carl-Zeiss-Stiftung
- Leipzig 1983 – Kulturbundgalerie Leipzig University of Applied Sciences
- Berlin 1984 – Galerie Unter den Linden
- Ratzeburg 1989 – Andreas Paul Weber Museum
- Berlin 1991 – Blue Point Gallery
- Aalborg Dänemark 1993 – Kunsthalle
- Leipzig 1994 – Kustodie der Universität
- Leipzig 1995 – Museum of Antiquities of Leipzig University
- Chemnitz 1998 – Neue Sächsische Galerie
- Leipzig 2007 – Hochschule für Telekommunikation
- Bad Steben 2008 – Grafik-Museum Stiftung Schreiner
- Dessau 2008 – Orangerie des Schlosses Georgium
- Leipzig 2011 – Hotel Mercure

== Factory locations ==
The "Bundesverband Bildender Künstlerinnen und Künstler" (BBK) lists the following institutions in which works by Peter Sylvester are in public possession:

Aalborg, KUNSTEN – Museum of modern art | Altenburg, Lindenau-Museum | Kupferstichkabinett Berlin | Dresden City Art Gallery Grafische Sammlung | Erfurt, Angermuseum | Leipzig, Museum der bildenden Künste | Halle (Saale), Kunstmuseum Moritzburg Halle (Saale) | Oberhausen, Ludwiggalerie Schloss Oberhausen | Paris, Bibliothèque nationale de France | National Gallery Prague | Quedlinburg, Museum Lyonel Feininger | Rostock Art Gallery | Staatliches Museum Schwerin | National Museum, Warsaw
