= Gabriele Meyer-Dennewitz =

German woman painter and academic scholar

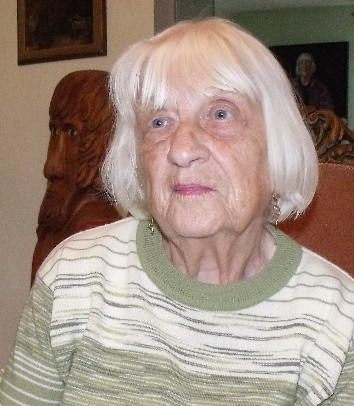
Gabriele Meyer-Dennewitz in May 2010

Gabriele Meyer-Dennewitz (21 July 1922 – 13 March 2011) was a German painter, graphic designer and academic scholar.

== Life ==
Meyer-Dennewitz was born in Leipzig. After attending the Leipzig School of Arts and Crafts from 1938 to 1940, Gabriele Meyer-Dennewitz studied at the Academy of Visual Arts in Leipzig from 1941 to 1944 under Karl Miersch, Wilhelm Thiele and Hans Soltmann. During this time she received private lessons from Max Schwimmer. After her studies she worked as an assistant teacher for drawing and art history until 1945, then as a freelance artist.

In 1950/51, Meyer-Dennwitz was a master student of Max Lingner and Heinrich Ehmsen at the Academy of Arts, Berlin. In 1950, she was one of the co-founders of the Verband Bildender Künstler der DDR. She remained connected to her hometown of Leipzig for a long time, from 1953 to 1957 as an assistant and lecturer at the Academy of Visual Arts Leipzig, from 1958 as a lecturer and from 1969 to 1982 as head of the Institute for Art Education at the Karl Marx University Leipzig, where she held a Professor position at the Institute for Art Education from 1961 to 1982. She is known to many children and young people through her prints in schoolbooks of the German Democratic Republic.

Meyer-Dennewitz had already lived in Carwitz since 1964, initially as a summer residence, and from 1991 until her death in 2011 all year round. She also ran a children's circle there.

Meyer-Dennewitz was married twice. Her first husband, Erich Dennewitz, was killed in the Second World War. Afterwards she married the graphic artist Wolfgang Meyer. Her son Ekkehard Dennewitz studied theatre studies in Leipzig, then worked at the Theater Cottbus, the Theater Junge Generation in Dresden, the Plauen Theater and was artistic director of the Hessisches Landestheater Marburg from 1991 to 2010.

Study trips took her to Czechoslovakia (1956,1957,1960,1980), the Soviet Union (among others in 1959, 1963, 1969), Korea (1959), Yugoslavia (1961), Romania (1979) and Hungary (1981).

Meyer-Dennewitz died in 2011 at the age of 88 in the district of Carwitz, which belongs to the municipality of Feldberger Seenlandschaft, and was buried in the local cemetery.

== Work ==
- 1957 Fragen eines lesenden Arbeiters (drawing on wood) and Zyklus Großer Oktober
- 1958 Cycle Gedanken zum The Caucasian Chalk Circle (woodcut)
- 1969 Urlaub in Carwitz I (algrafy)
- 1970 Carmina Burana (woodcut series)
- 1980 Das Geburtshaus (Drawing)
- 1982 Tapestry-Entwurf zum 575. Geburtstag der Leipziger Universität (Tempera)
- 1998 Herbstlied (pastel on hardboard)
- 2001 Gefährliches Spiel (pastel on hardboard)
- 2005 Selbst (Pastell)
- 1966 Buchillustration Der Mann mit der gelben Tasche (Deutscher Militärverlag Berlin)

== Exhibitions ==
- 1974/75, 1982, 2010 Leipzig
- 1983 Neubrandenburg, Kulturhaus (Painting, Graphics and Hand Drawings, 60th Birthday Exhibition)
- 2005 Marburg
- 2010 Leipzig "Heimspiel" Ausstellung zum 88. Geburtstag

Meyer-Dennewitz was represented at the Art Exhibition of the GDR in 1953, 1962 and 1967, and works by her were shown at the Leipzig district art exhibitions in 1955, 1959, 1965, 1972, 1974, 1979 and 1985.

== Awards ==
- 1957: Art Prize of the Society for German–Soviet Friendship
- 1962: Kunstpreis der Stadt Leipzig
- 1968: Ehrennadel der Gesellschaft für Deutsch-Sowjetische Freundschaft
- 1978: Pestalozzi-Medaille für treue Dienste
- 1982: Johannes-R.-Becher-Medaille
- 1984: Hans-Fallada-Preis Stufe I, II, III.
