= Alois Kolb =

Austrian artist (1875–1942)

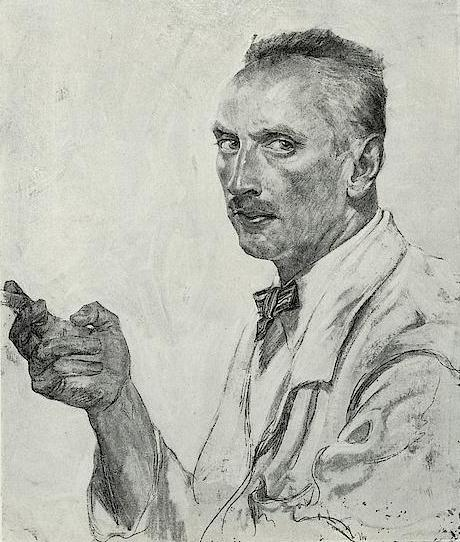
Alois Kolb - Selbstporträt mit Zigarette

Alois Kolb (2 February 1875, in Vienna – 5 April 1942, in Leipzig) was an Austrian etcher, painter and graphic artist.

== Gallery ==
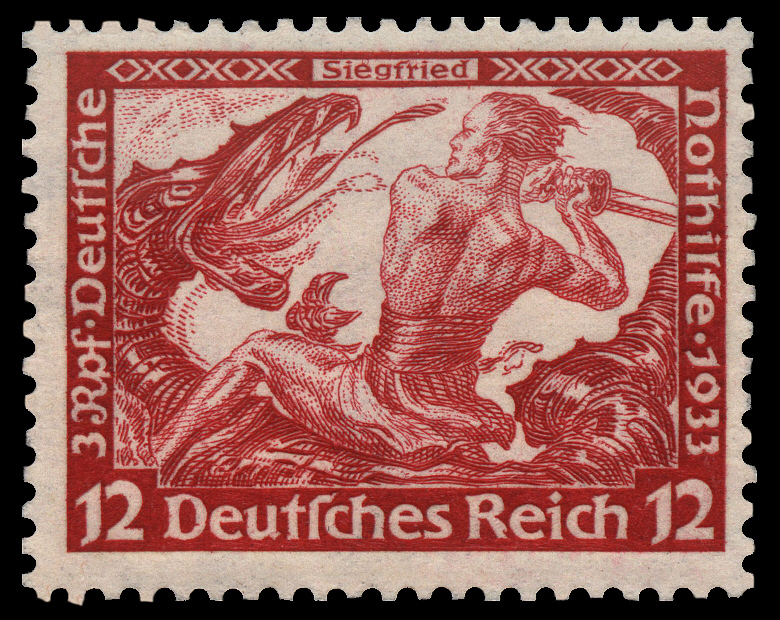
Stap designam

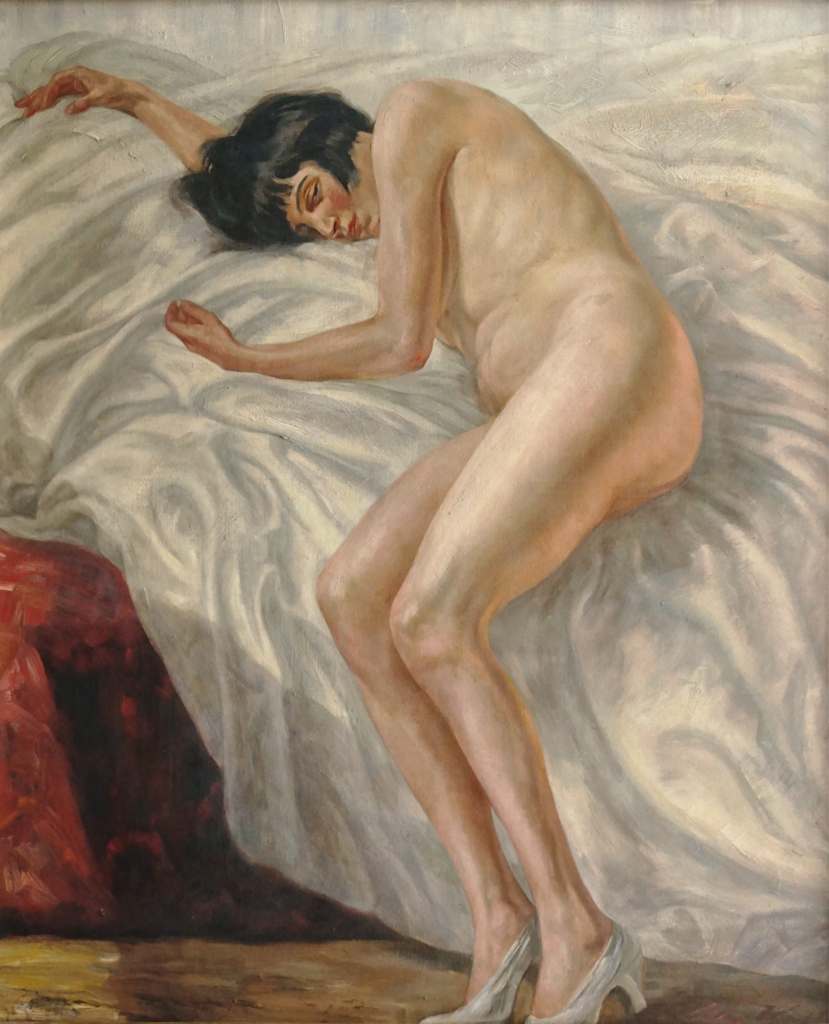
painting

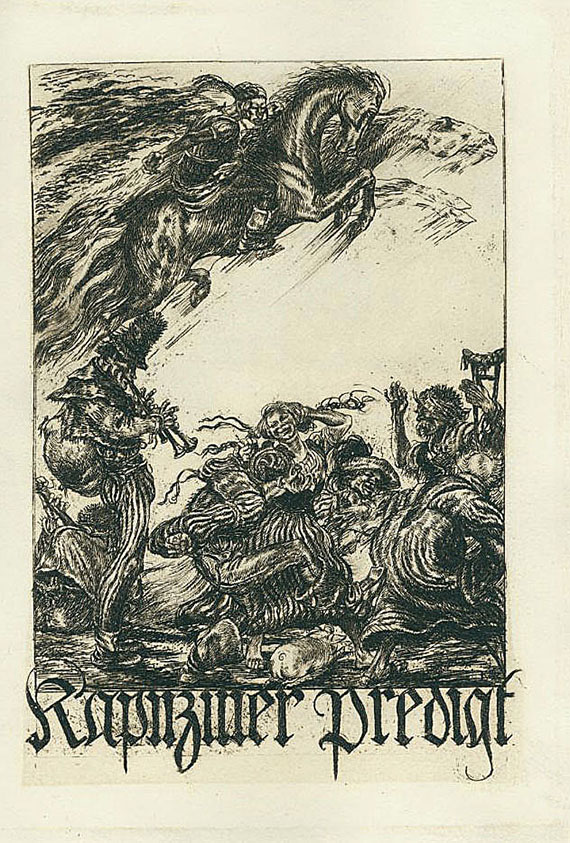
print

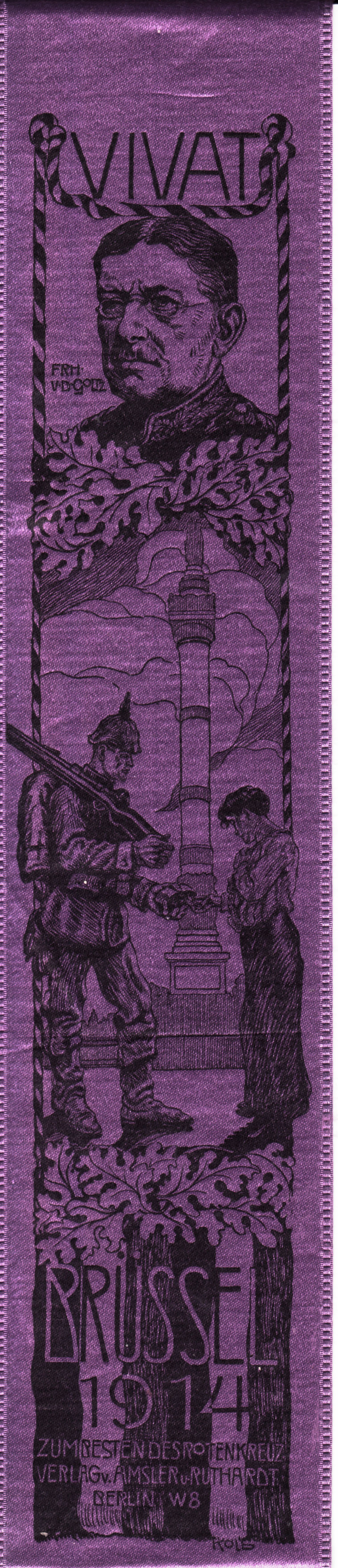
Vivat ribbon
