= Peter Herrmann =

German composer

- Born: 19 December 1941; Chemnitz, Germany
- Died: 28 October 2015 (aged 73); Leipzig, Germany
- Education: Robert-Schumann-Konservatorium Zwickau; Musikhochschule Leipzig
- Occupations: Composer; Academic teacher; University rector
- Organizations: Theaterhochschule Leipzig; Musikhochschule Leipzig
- Awards: Kunstpreis der Stadt Leipzig; Hanns Eisler Prize; Kunstpreis der DDR

Peter Herrmann (19 December 1941 – 28 October 2015) was a German composer and academic teacher. He composed three operas and a ballet, but mainly instrumental music both for orchestra and chamber music. His works have been performed internationally; his second string quartet was awarded a prize at the Prague Spring International Music Festival. He was professor of composition at the Musikhochschule Leipzig from 1969, serving as its rector from 1984 to 1987.

== Life ==
Herrmann was born in 1941 in Chemnitz. From 1956 to 1960, he studied violin at the Robert-Schumann-Konservatorium Zwickau. From 1960 to 1965, he studied violin and composition at the Musikhochschule Leipzig with Fritz Geißler and Wilhelm Weismann. During this time he composed his second string quartet and Sonatine for string orchestra. The string quartet was awarded second prize at the Prague Spring International Music Festival in 1965. From 1965 until 1967, he was Mendelssohn Scholar of the Ministry of Culture of the GDR.

Herrmann taught at the Theaterhochschule Leipzig from 1967, teaching music to students of acting. In 1969, he became scientific assistant for composition, instrumentation and form analysis at the Musikhochschule Leipzig. In the same year he received the Kunstpreis der Stadt Leipzig. Ten years later he received the Art Prize of the German Democratic Republic and the Hanns Eisler Prize by Radio DDR 2. Also in 1979, his Second Symphony was premiered by the Gewandhausorchester conducted by Kurt Masur. He was appointed professor of composition in 1984 at the Musikhochschule, by now named Hochschule für Musik Felix Mendelssohn Bartholdy, and was its University rector from 1984 to 1987.

Herrmann died in Leipzig at the age of 73.

== Work ==
Herrmann composed music of many genres. He wrote three operas and a ballet. He composed the film music for the 1971 Zeichner – Zeuge – Zeitgenosse, a short documentary of the artist Leo Haas.

Herrmann focused on music for instruments. He wrote orchestral music including four symphonies, Concerto for Orchestra, a chamber symphony, Sonatine for string orchestra, a violin concerto, a trumpet concerto, two piano concertos, and two cello concertos. He composed chamber music including four string quartets, four piano trios, a piano quintet and an oboe quartet. He composed piano music and works for organ. For voices, he composed Lieder and Mater Terra, a cantata for soprano and chamber ensemble.

Herrmann composed a work entitled Kant Pop Symphony in 2004 to celebrate the anniversary of the philosopher Immanuel Kant. It was premiered at the Musikhochschule Leipzig by a speaker of texts by Kant, a pop singer, tape, flute, oboe, jazz trumpet, saxophone, electric guitar, piano, harmonica and string quartet.

== Awards ==
- 1965: 2nd prize at the Prague Spring International Music Festival for the String Quartet No. 2, Mendelssohn Scholarship
- 1969: Kunstpreis der Stadt Leipzig
- 1979: Hanns Eisler Prize, Kunstpreis der DDR
