= Hanns Maaßen =

Hanns Maaßen (born as Otto Johannes Maaßen; 26 December 1908, in Lübeck – 23 June 1983, in Mahlow) was a German journalist and writer.

== Life ==
Hanns Maaßen came from a working-class family. He completed a lesson as a stonemason and worked subsequently in the profession. He was a member of the Young Communist League of Germany and from 1928 the Communist Party of Germany. He participated in a strike of the Stone Mason Union against the beginning rearmament in Kiel in 1931 caused by the launching of the German pocket battleship Deutschland. Maaßen was the editor of the communist Norddeutsch Zeitung (North German Newspaper). After the National socialist takeover, he became unlawful in 1933 and would be arrested that same year and spent a year in KZ Kieslau in Baden. He fled Germany in 1935 and emigrated through Saarland and France into Switzerland.

Since he had been actively publishing for the Kommitee für Recht und Freiheit (Committee for Law and Freedom) in Zurich, he took part from November 1936 on the side of the Second Spanish Republic in the Spanish Civil War as a member of the International Brigades. He was a contributing editor of the German language edition of the International Brigades' newspaper "El voluntario de la libertad" and also orator at the German language "Freiheitssender 29,8" (Freedom Transmitter 29.8) in 1938 and 1939. After the resignation of the Republic in 1939, Maaßen would be jailed and spent the following year in prisons and camps of Francoist Spain. He could first return to Germany in 1946 when he settled in the Soviet occupation zone.

Hanns Maaßen started worked as a commentator at Sender Leipzig where he would be dismissed in 1950 because of "leftist allowances". From 1953 to 1966, he was editor at the Leipzig created newspaper "Volkskunst" and from 1968 to 1971 chairman Editor in chief of the East German weekly newspaper "Sonntag". From 1971, he lived as an author in Kleinmachnow.

Hanns Maaßen wrote essays on literary themes narrative works in which he processed the experiences of his many year Spanish stay.

Hanns Maaßen received the 1957 Heinrich Mann Prize, the bronze Patriotic Order of Merit in 1959, the 1960 Kunstpreis der Stadt Leipzig (Art Prize of the City of Leipzig), the silver Vaterländischer Verdienstorden in 1969, the Art Prize of the Free German Trade Union Federation in 1979 and the gold Patriotic Order of Merit also in 1979.

== Works ==
- Die Messe des Barcelo (The Mass of Barcelo), Halle (Saale) 1956
- Die Söhne des Tschapajew (The Sons of the Tschapajew), Berlin 1960
- Die Kreuzertaufe (The Cross Baptism), Berlin 1963
- Spanien (Spain), Leipzig 1965
- Potsdam (Potsdam), Leipzig 1969
- In der Stunde der Gefahr (In the Hour of Danger), Berlin 1971
- Gedenkstätte der deutschen Interbrigadisten (Memorial Place of the German International Brigade), Berlin 1974
- Vom Heuberg weht ein scharfer Wind (From Heuberg blew a sharp Wind), Berlin 1978

== Publishing work ==
- Odio y amor, Leipzig 1967 (together with Karl Kormes)
- Brigada Internacional ist unser Ehrenname ... (Brigada Internacional is our honorary name), Berlin
  - Bd. 1 (1974)
  - Bd. 2 (1974)
