= Fritz Geißler =

German composer

Fritz Geißler (or Geissler, 16 September 1921 – 11 January 1984) was a composer in the German Democratic Republic who wrote around 140 works, including four operas and eleven symphonies.

== Life and career ==
Geißler was born in Wurzen, Saxony, on 16 September 1921 to Elsa and Walther Geißler; he was raised in modest circumstances. His first violin lessons came from the leader of a local tenants' association's mandolin-band, himself a pipe-fitter. Following graduation from public school, Geissler went into training with the town-pipers band of Naunhof. He trained as an apprentice at the Staatliches Musikinstitut in Naunhof near Leipzig from 1936 to 1939. He earned the means to continue private lessons in violin, piano, and music theory as a bar and coffee house fiddler in Leipzig. Later, in 1979, he used his experiences from this time in his opera Die Stadtpfeifer (The Town Pipers).

In 1940 he was conscripted into the Wehrmacht as a musician, and ordered to Guernsey in 1942, where he served in the Luftwaffe's musical corps. In 1945 he became a prisoner of war of the British, where he was offered the opportunity to play second violin in a string quartet, and to compose or arrange choral settings for the prison choir. After his release in 1948 he studied composition and viola at the Musikhochschule Leipzig with Max Dehnert, Arnold Matz and Wilhelm Weismann.

He was a violist with the Landessinfonieorchester Thüringen in Gotha from 1950 to 1951 when a hand injury ended his career as a musician. From 1951 to 1954 he studied composition at the College of Music at Berlin-Charlottenburg with Boris Blacher, Friedrich Noetel and Hermann Wunsch. Beginning in 1954, Geissler taught theory of music and composition at the Institute for Musical Education, at the University of Leipzig; later he became docent and professor of composition at the musical colleges in Leipzig and Dresden. His pupils included Wilfried Krätzschmar, Peter Herrmann, Reinhard Pfundt, Karl Ottomar Treibmann, Friedrich Schenker and Lothar Voigtländer. From 1956 to 1968 he was president of the Leipzig Composers Society; from 1971 he was a member of the East German Arts Academy, the same year that he received a national award; and from 1972 he was vice-president of the East German Composers Society.

Geißler died in Bad Saarow, Brandenburg, on 11 January 1984, at the age of 62.

== Works ==
The compositional legacy of Fritz Geißler involves about 140 pieces, including eleven symphonies, concertos for violin, flute, cello, piano, and organ, four operas -- Der Zerbrochene Krug (The Smashed Jug), Der Schatten (The Shadow), Der verrückte Jourdain (The Crazy Jourdain), and Das Chagrinleder (Shagreen), ballets, cantatas, oratorios, and chamber music of widely varying types and settings. His works were performed by noted artists, and by important orchestras and opera houses of both East and West Germany and elsewhere.

His most important works are arguably the operas, including an adaptation (from 1968 to 1969) of Kleist's Der zerbrochne Krug. However, his eleven symphonies were also well received, and have been performed by outstanding groups like the Gewandhausorchester Leipzig and the Staatskapelle Dresden. His Second Symphony (1962–1964) was the first East German symphony to employ serialism.
