= Vivat ribbons =

World War I Red Cross fundraising ribbons

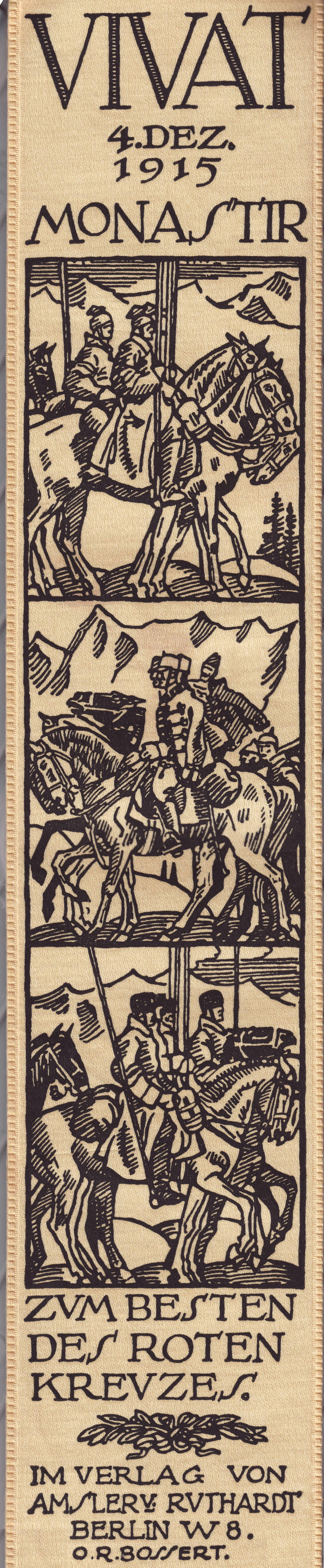
Vivat ribbon commemorating the Central Powers victory at the Battle of Monastir

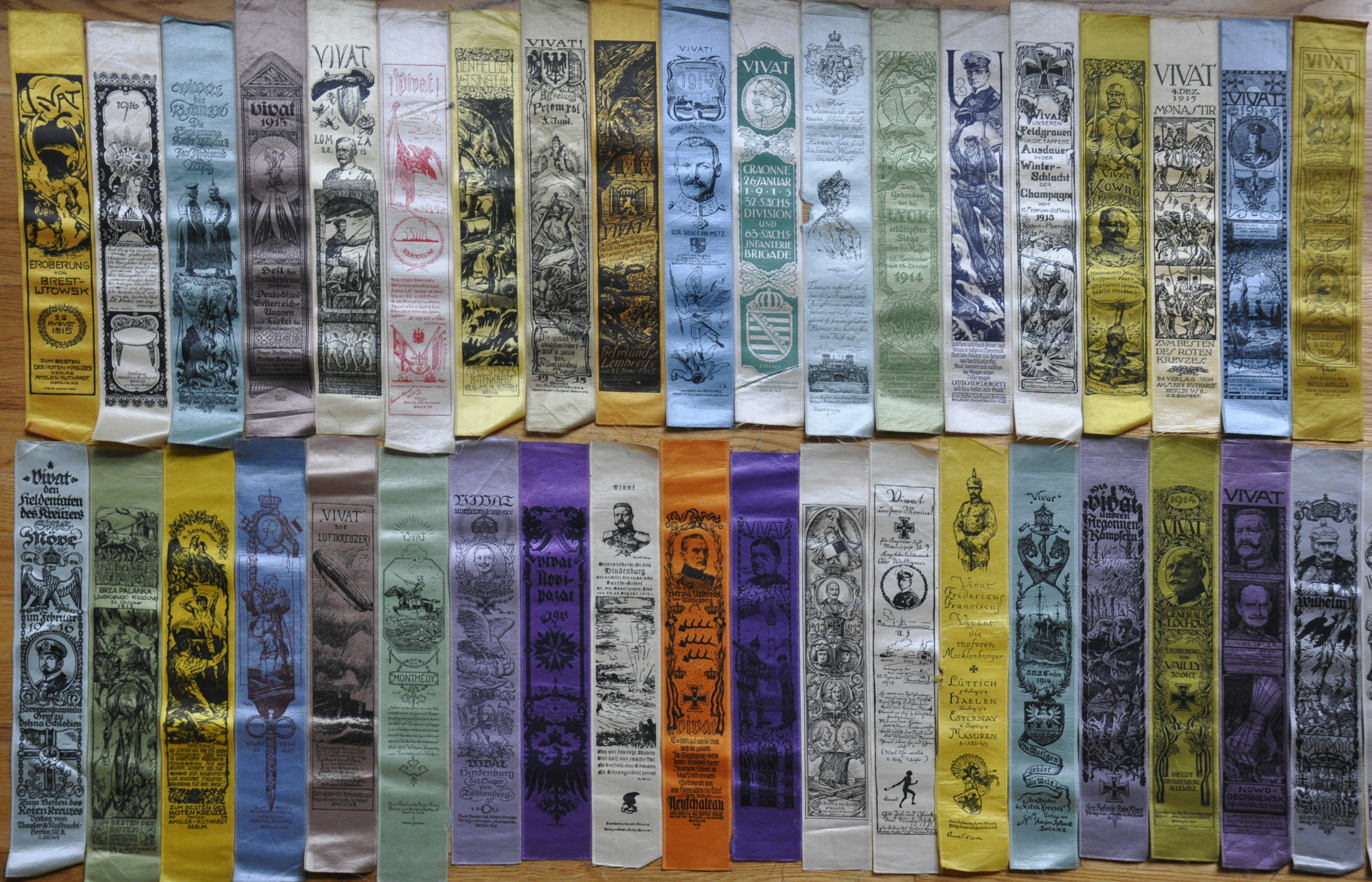
A collection of vivat ribbons

Vivat ribbons (German: Vivatbänder) were silk ribbons issued to raise money for the Red Cross in Germany and Austria during World War I.

Ribbons had printed patriotic messages which celebrated battles and important events, as well as royalty and the military leaders. They were designed by many famous German artists of the period. Most ribbons had the same size and followed the same design pattern with word "Vivat!" ("Long live!") printed on top, followed by unique text and graphic below. The bottom of the ribbon showed "Zum Besten Des Roten Kreuzes; Verlag Amsler u. Ruthardt; Berlin W8" ("To the benefit of the Red Cross; Verlag Amsler & Ruthardt; Berlin W8") text, since they were released by the German Red Cross to raise funds for war relief. During World War I 200,000 ribbons were sold and they become popular collector's items.

== Bibliography ==
- Vanja, Konrad (1985). Vivat, Vivat, Vivat!: Widmungs- und Gedenkbänder aus drei Jahrhunderten (in German). Vol. 12. Staatliche Museen Preussischer Kulturbesitz, Museum für Deutsche Volkskunde. ISBN 9783886091096.
- Krefeld, Stadt (1980). 100 Jahre Textilmuseum Krefeld (in German). Stadt Krefeld. p. 11.
- Hellfaier, Detlev. "Vivatbänder als Umzugsfunde" (PDF). Archived from the original (PDF) on 2018-08-26.
- Hans-Christian Pust: Vivatbänder, in: Didier, Christophe (Hg.): 1914–1918 In Papiergewittern. Die Kriegssammlungen der Bibliotheken, Paris: Somogy 2008, p. 204–209.
- Entry Vivat in Meyers Enzyklopädisches Lexikon. Bibliographisches Institut, Lexikonverlag, Mannheim/Wien/Zürich 1975, volume 24, p. 639.
