= Paul Kurzbach =

German composer

Paul Kurzbach (13 December 1902 – 2 August 1997) was a German composer.

== Life ==
Born in Hohndorf, Saxony, Kurzbach came from a humble background and became involved early on among others as a leader of workers' choirs in the labour movement. From 1916 to 1923, he studied at the teacher training college Zschopau and worked as a teacher from 1921 to 1933. In 1920 he began studying music at the Leipzig Conservatory, which he completed in 1928. Here he made the acquaintance of Hermann Scherchen, who encouraged the young composer. From 1939 to 1942 he was a pupil of Carl Orff. During the National Socialist era, Kurzbach became a member of the NSDAP in 1939. He became a soldier in World War II and was a prisoner of war until 1946. He then moved to Karl-Marx-Stadt and became a member of the SED and the FDGB. He worked as a choir director and as an employee of the FDGB, the Kulturbund and other institutions. Kurzbach re-entered the teaching profession and was, among other things, head of the Karl-Marx-Stadt Folk Music School. From 1951 to 1975 he was chairman, then honorary chairman, of the composers' association in the Karl-Marx-Stadt district. Kurzbach was also active in the central board of the composers' association and was its vice-president from 1968 to 1977. He had been a freelance composer since 1955. Kurzbach was highly respected in the GDR; among other awards, he received the Honorary Ribbon of the Patriotic Order of Merit in gold in 1982, the Order of Star of People's Friendship in gold in 1987 as well as the Prize for Popular Artistic Creation. He was also an honorary citizen of Karl-Marx-Stadt.

== Style ==
Decisive for Kurzbach's musical language were impulses from Carl Orff and Hanns Eisler. Orff's influence can be seen above all in a differentiated, complex rhythm, a sound described as rough, hard or pithy and a preference for clear structures. Eisler gave Kurzbach important ideas regarding his understanding of the social function of music: Kurzbach saw himself as motivated by a social mission, strove to create musical institutions for a broad mass and saw music as a means of changing the world. His oeuvre therefore contains many works composed for amateurs. Kurzbach's musical creativity only found its full expression roughly since the founding of the GDR. The main focus of his work is vocal music. Song-like, vocal melodies can also be found in his instrumental music. Although Kurzbach was not categorically opposed to musical innovations, he was of the opinion that comprehensibility and the relationship to the listener had to be given top priority. For this reason, he did not abandon the reference to tonality, although he repeatedly explored its limits. In reunified Germany, however, he did not find the recognition he had enjoyed in the GDR.

Kurzbach died in Chemnitz at the age of 94.

== Work ==
- Orchestra pieces
  - Symphony op. 12 (designated as No. 1; 1926)
  - Symphony in C (1952)
  - Chamber Symphony op. 21 (1931)
  - Dafnis, Lyrical Portrait for Orchestra after Arno Holz (1950)
  - Divertimento for small orchestra (1953)
  - Peasant Music, Four Pieces for Orchestra (1959/60)
  - Thyl Claas – a portrait (1961/62)
  - Orchestral Variations on a Melody by Henry Purcell (1966)
  - 7 Serenades, among others:
    - No. 1 for orchestra (1964)
    - No. 2 for orchestra (1968)
    - No. 3 for orchestra (1969)
    - No. 5 for wind orchestra
    - No. 6 for strings (1971)
    - No. 7 for soprano, bass and orchestra after texts by Weisenborn, Brecht and Strittmatter (1972)
- Concertos
  - Concerto for Harpsichord and Strings (1957)
  - Concertino for piano and strings (1965)
  - Violin Concerto (1969)
  - Violoncello Concerto (1982)
  - Stage work
  - Young Love, opera based on Gottfried Keller's Romeo and Juliet in the Village (1933–36)
  - Historia de Susanna, Opera (1946)
  - Thomas Müntzer, Opera (1948–51, rev. 1972/73)
  - Thyl Claas, Opera (1955/56)
  - Jean the Soldier, three-act opera (1981)
- Vocal music
  - May Cantata after Günter Felkel (1951)
  - An die Nachgeborenen, cantata after Bertolt Brecht (1951)
  - Cantata of Friendship after Horst Salomon (1959)
  - Hymn to the Era of Peaceful Times, cantata (1960)
  - Alles wandelt sich, cantata after Brecht (1970)
  - News about Ole Bienkopp', cantata after Erwin Strittmatter (1978)
  - Stella caerulea nostra', oratorio (1988)
  - 206 solo songs, songs and chansons
  - 150 choral and mass songs
- Chamber music
  - Concerto for solo double bass, wind quintet, harpsichord and percussion (1980)
  - String quintet O miracol d'amore conversazione con Carlo Gesualdo (1989)
  - Piano Quintet (1990)
  - 9 string quartets (1945, 1947, 1948, 1958, 1975, 1977, 1985, 1986, 1991)
  - Quartet for flute, horn, harp and violin (1990)
  - Piano Trio op. 9 (c. 1925/26)
  - Piano Trio (1967)
  - Trio for oboe, clarinet and bassoon (1938)
  - Trio for accordion, guitar and violoncello (1983)
  - Sonatina for violin and piano (1962)
  - Sonatina for violoncello and piano (1961)
  - Sonata for violoncello solo Mother and the Neutron Bomb (after Yevgeny Yevtushenko) (1985)
- Piano music
  - 3 Sonatinas (1947, 1947, 1963)
