= Rosemarie Lang =

German operatic mezzo-soprano

Rosemarie Lang (21 May 1947 – 12 January 2017) was a German operatic mezzo-soprano.

== Life ==
Born in Grünstädtel, Lang studied at the University of Music and Theatre Leipzig with Elisabeth Breul, Eva Schubert-Hoffmann and Helga Forner. At the 1969 Robert Schumann International Competition for Pianists and Singers she won 2nd prize, and at the 1972 International Johann Sebastian Bach Competition she won 1st prize ("Bach Prize Winner"), both in the "Ladies' Singing" category.

She began her stage career at the Theater Altenburg Gera, and from 1972 she was an ensemble member of the Oper Leipzig. In 1987, she moved to the Staatsoper Unter den Linden. She made her debut there as Clytemnestra in Gluck's Iphigenia in Aulis. She remained an ensemble member of the Staatsoper until her retirement from the stage for health reasons in 2009.

Guest appearances took her to the Salzburg Festival and the Vienna State Opera, among others. In addition to her operatic activities, she also cultivated concert, lied and oratorio singing. Numerous radio and recordings document her artistic activity.
