= Rudolf Fischer (musician) =

German pianist, pedagogue and rector

Rudolf Karl Fischer
- Born: Rudolf Karl Fischer; July 13, 1913; Leipzig, Germany
- Died: July 29, 2003 (aged 90)
- Education: Felix Mendelssohn College of Music and Theatre
- Occupations: Pianist, pedagogue, rector
- Organization: Felix Mendelssohn College of Music and Theatre
- Known for: Initiating the International Johann Sebastian Bach Competition
- Title: Rector
- Term: 1948–1973
- Awards: Patriotic Order of Merit

Rudolf Karl Fischer (13 July 1913, Leipzig – 29 July 2003) was a German pianist, pedagogue and rector at the Felix Mendelssohn College of Music and Theatre in Leipzig.

== Biography ==
Fischer was rector of the Felix Mendelssohn College of Music and Theatre from 1948 to 1973. He initiated the International Johann Sebastian Bach Competition, Leipzig in 1964 and served as the president of the competition until 1973. Fischer was president of the "Association Européene de Conservatoires, Academies de Musique et Musik-Hochschulen" between 1968 and 1974.

As a performer he played with the Gewandhausorchester, Leipzig and the Staatskapelle Dresden and made several recordings. He was also a member of the Schumann-Gesellschaft, Zwickau and the Neue Bachgesellschaft, Leipzig.
