= Wilhelm Weismann =

German composer and musicologist (1900–1980)

Wilhelm Weismann (20 September 1900 – 14 May 1980) was a German composer and musicologist.

== Life ==
On 20 September, Weismann was born in Alfdorf/Württemberg on the plateau of Welzheim forest. His parents ran a general store. His mother, sister of the renowned musicologist Alfred Heuß, encouraged his artistic inclinations and he received his first piano and music lessons. At an early age the son of a merchant showed his musical interest by composing small choral pieces.

After a long struggle for his father's permission, he studied composition (with Sigfrid Karg-Elert) and musicology (with Hermann Abert and Arnold Schering) at the State University of Music and Performing Arts Stuttgart from 1919 to 1921 and then in Leipzig from 1921 to 1923. After completing his studies, he embarked on a momentous trip to Italy in 1924, visiting Sicily, Rome, Naples and Florence, during which he was greatly impressed by Italian architecture and painting. In the Uffizi he could see original compositions by Carlo Gesualdo. They inspired him to "Four Italian Madrigals", which were performed in 1925 at the Donaueschinger Musiktage and made him suddenly famous.

From 1924 he was editor and correspondent of the "Neue Zeitschrift für Musik", whose publisher was his uncle Alfred Heuß. In 1929 he became editor at the Leipzig music publishing house Edition Peters where he was appointed chief editor for the first time in the history of the publishing house in 1956. In addition to publications, he supervised the "Peters-Nachrichten", co-founded the "Deutsches Jahrbuch für Musikwissenschaft" and after 1945 expanded the profile of the publishing house to include contributions from contemporary music. He supported several younger composer colleagues. Through his mediation the pianist and teacher Bronisław of Poźniak could be won over for the new edition of Chopin's piano works in the Edition Peters.

From 1946 to 1955 and from 1961 to 1976 he taught at the Leipzig Academy of Music, in 1948 he was appointed professor. From 1956 to 1963 he supervised the first complete edition of Gesualdo's madrigals, whose work, together with Italian vocal music in essays and in musical debate, occupied him throughout his life.

In 1968 he protested in a telegram to the Mayor of Leipzig against the demolition of the Paulinerkirche as a "unique cultural monument". In 1964 he received the National Prize of the GDR III. class and at the beginning of May 1980 the Patriotic Order of Merit in gold.

Weismann died on 14 May 1980 in Leipzig at the age of 79.

== Work ==
- Vier italienische Madrigale (1925)
- Der 23. Psalm (Der Herr ist mein Hirte), Motette für Solo und Chor (1954)
- Konzert für Soli, gemischten Chor und Orgel (1957)
- Drei Madrigale nach Worten von Friedrich Hölderlin (1963)
- Die vier Jahreszeiten. Madrigal. (1970)
- Sechs Lieder nach altdeutschen Dichtungen für Gesang und Klavier (1974)
- Sulamith. Konzert für Solosopran, Chor und großes Orchester (1975)
- Mein schwäbisches Liederbuch für Gesang und Klavier (1980)

== Source ==
- triangel. Das Kulturmagazin von MDR Figaro. – 11. Jahrgang November 2006, edited by MDR – S. 34, 35, 36, 37, 38, 39. aus „Ein Lebensbild“ von Dr. sc. phil. Eberhard Kneipel.
