= University of Music and Theatre Leipzig =

Public university in Leipzig, Germany

Coordinates: 51°20′00″N 12°22′05″E

University of Music and Theatre "Felix Mendelssohn Bartholdy" Leipzig
- Hochschule für Musik und Theater "Felix Mendelssohn Bartholdy" Leipzig
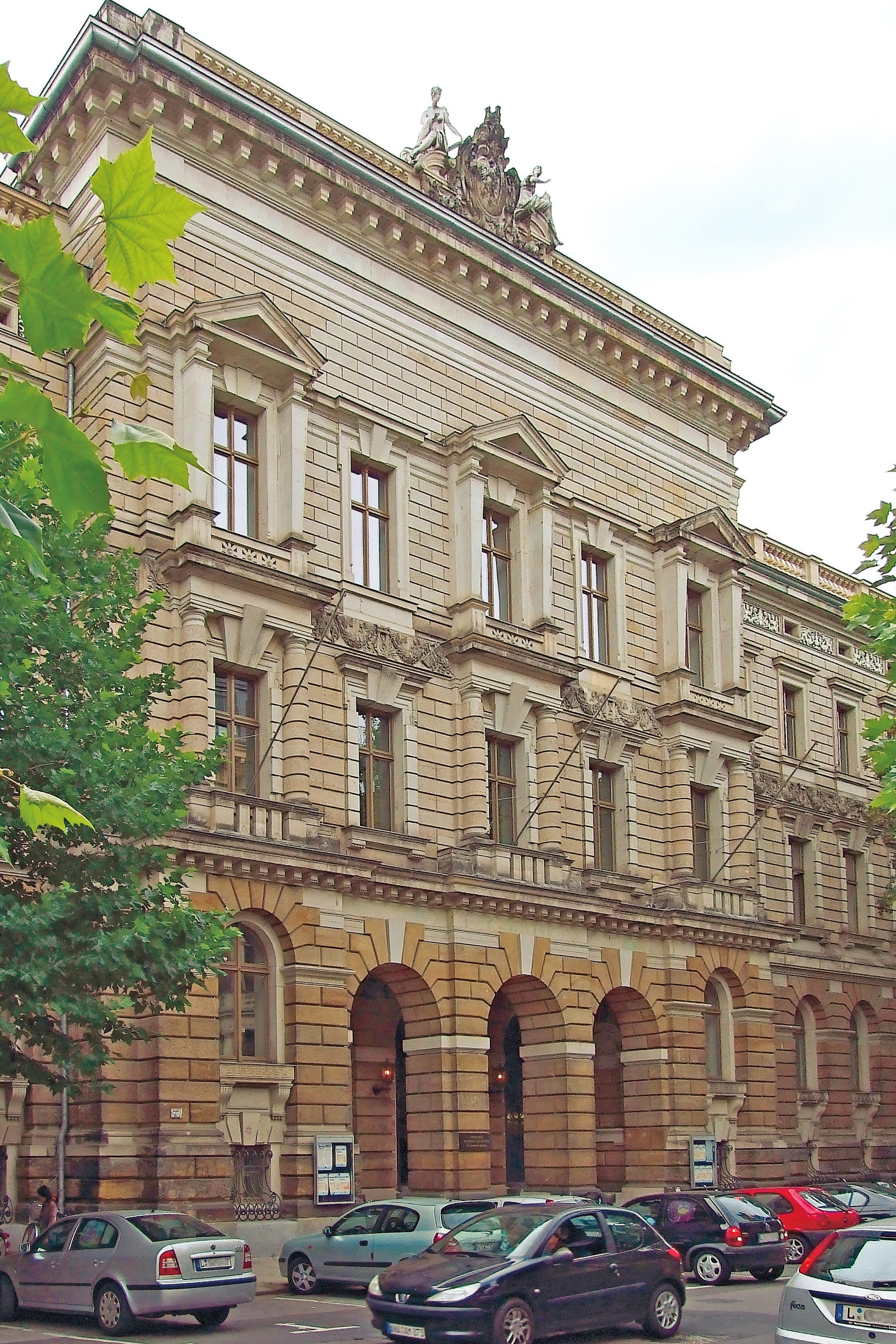
- Former names: Conservatory of Music, Royal Conservatorium of Music, State Conservatorium of Music
- Type: Public
- Established: April 2, 1843; 183 years ago
- Chancellor: Oliver Grimm
- Rector: Gerald Fauth
- Administrative staff: 519
- Students: 813
- Location: Leipzig, Saxony, Germany
- Campus: Urban
- Website: www.hmt-leipzig.de

The University of Music and Theatre "Felix Mendelssohn Bartholdy" Leipzig (German: Hochschule für Musik und Theater "Felix Mendelssohn Bartholdy" Leipzig) is a public university in Leipzig, Saxony, Germany. Founded in 1843 by Felix Mendelssohn as the Conservatorium der Musik (Conservatory of Music), (Note: Music historians writing in English usually refer to the institution during Mendelssohn's time as the Leipzig Conservatory.) it is the oldest university school of music in Germany.

The institution includes the traditional Church Music Institute founded in 1919 by Karl Straube (1873–1950). The music school was renamed "Felix Mendelssohn Bartholdy" after its founder in 1972. In 1992, it incorporated the Theaterhochschule "Hans Otto" Leipzig.

Since the beginning there was a tight relationship between apprenticeship and practical experience with the Gewandhaus and the Oper Leipzig, as well as theaters in Chemnitz (Theater Chemnitz), Dresden (Staatsschauspiel Dresden), Halle (Neues Theater Halle), Leipzig (Schauspiel Leipzig) and Weimar (Deutsches Nationaltheater in Weimar).

The university of music and theater is one of 365 places chosen in 2009 by the Cabinet of Germany and the Office of the Representative of German Industry and Trade for the campaign Germany – Land of Ideas.

== History ==
Felix Mendelssohn Bartholdy, the composer and Music Director of the Gewandhaus Orchestra, founded a Conservatory in the city of Leipzig on 2 April 1843. It was financed by a senior civil servant of the Kingdom of Saxony, the Oberhofgerichtsrat Heinrich Blümner (1765–1839), who provided King Frederick Augustus II of Saxony with 20,000 Thaler.

The music school's home was in the first Gewandhaus (in the Gewandgäßchen/Universitätsstraße street at the city center, today the city's department store is based there). The musicians of the Orchestra were obligated to act as teaching staff, a tradition that was unbroken until German reunification in 1990.

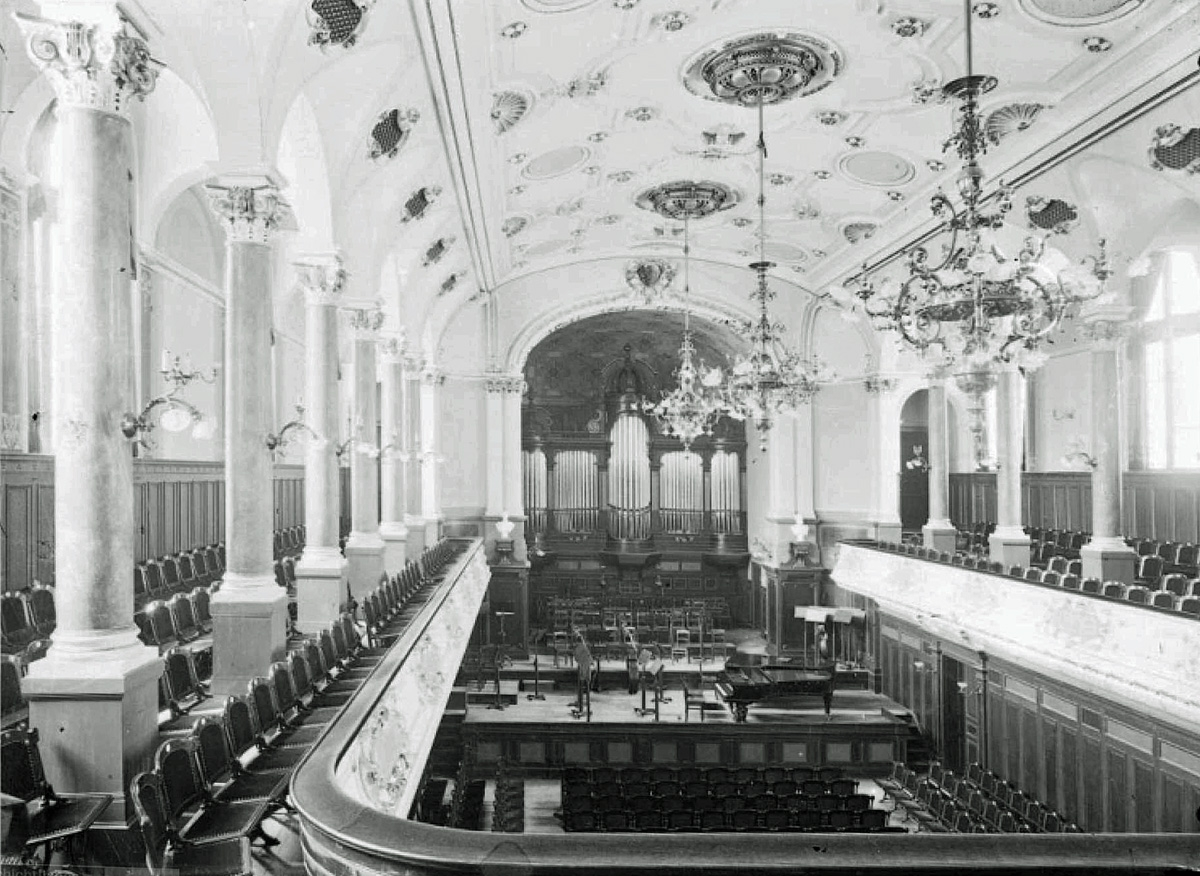
College Hall 1900

In 1876 the school got permission to change its name to Königliches Konservatorium der Musik zu Leipzig, Royal Conservatory of Music of Leipzig. The new premises at Grassistraße 8 were inaugurated on 5 December 1887. They were built 1885–1887 by the architect Hugo Licht in the new neighbourhood Musikviertel , south-west of the city center. The benefactor was the pathologist Justus Radius.

Not until 1924 was the Royal Conservatory renamed into Landeskonservatorium der Musik zu Leipzig, six years after the fall of the Kingdom of Saxony.

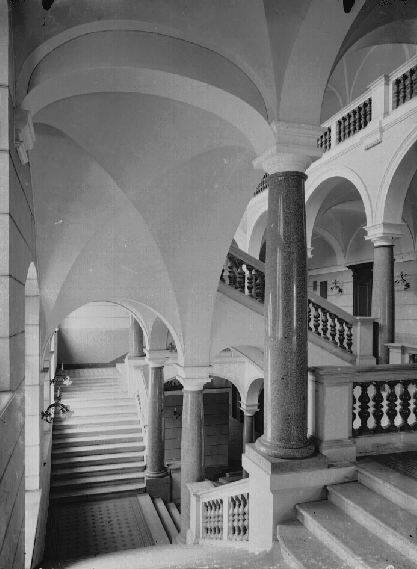
Staircase at the Grassistraße

In the summer term of 1938, 343 male students were enrolled at the Landeskonservatorium. This made the Conservatory the fourth biggest music school in the German Reich after the Universität der Künste Berlin (633 students), the music school of Cologne (406 students) and the school for music and theater of Munich (404 students).

The Austrian composer Johann Nepomuk David (1895–1977) was the school's director from 1939 until 1945.

The school was again renamed 8 June 1941 to Staatliche Hochschule für Musik, Musikerziehung und darstellende Kunst, Public College for music, musical education and performing arts. In 1944 the school remained closed due to the Second World War.

Once again, the school was renamed 1 October 1946 to Mendelssohn Academy and 4 November 1972, on the occasion of its founders name, to Hochschule für Musik Felix Mendelssohn Bartholdy, Felix Mendelssohn Bartholdy College of Music.

The Saxon University Constitution Law (Sächsische Hochschulstrukturgesetz) of 10 April 1992 confirmed the College of Music to Leipzig and expanded it with the annexation of the Hans Otto College of Theatre (Germany's first College of Theatre) to form the Hochschule für Musik und Theater Felix Mendelssohn Bartholdy : the Felix Mendelssohn Bartholdy College of Music and Theatre.

The new Great Hall was inaugurated 2001 and 2004 awarded by the Bund Deutscher Architekten, a German architects union. The college's second premises were opened 2002 and there's an orchestra academy in co-operation with the Gewandhausorchestra since 2004 in order to support top musicians.

== Names ==
- 1843–1876: Conservatorium der Musik
- 1876–1924: Königliches Konservatorium der Musik zu Leipzig
- 1924–1941: Landeskonservatorium der Musik zu Leipzig
- 1941–1944: Staatliche Hochschule für Musik, Musikerziehung und darstellende Kunst
- 1946–1972: Staatliche Hochschule für Musik – Mendelssohn-Akademie
- 1972–1992: Hochschule für Musik "Felix Mendelssohn Bartholdy"
- 1992–: Hochschule für Musik und Theater "Felix Mendelssohn Bartholdy" Leipzig

== Notable people ==
=== Notable alumni ===
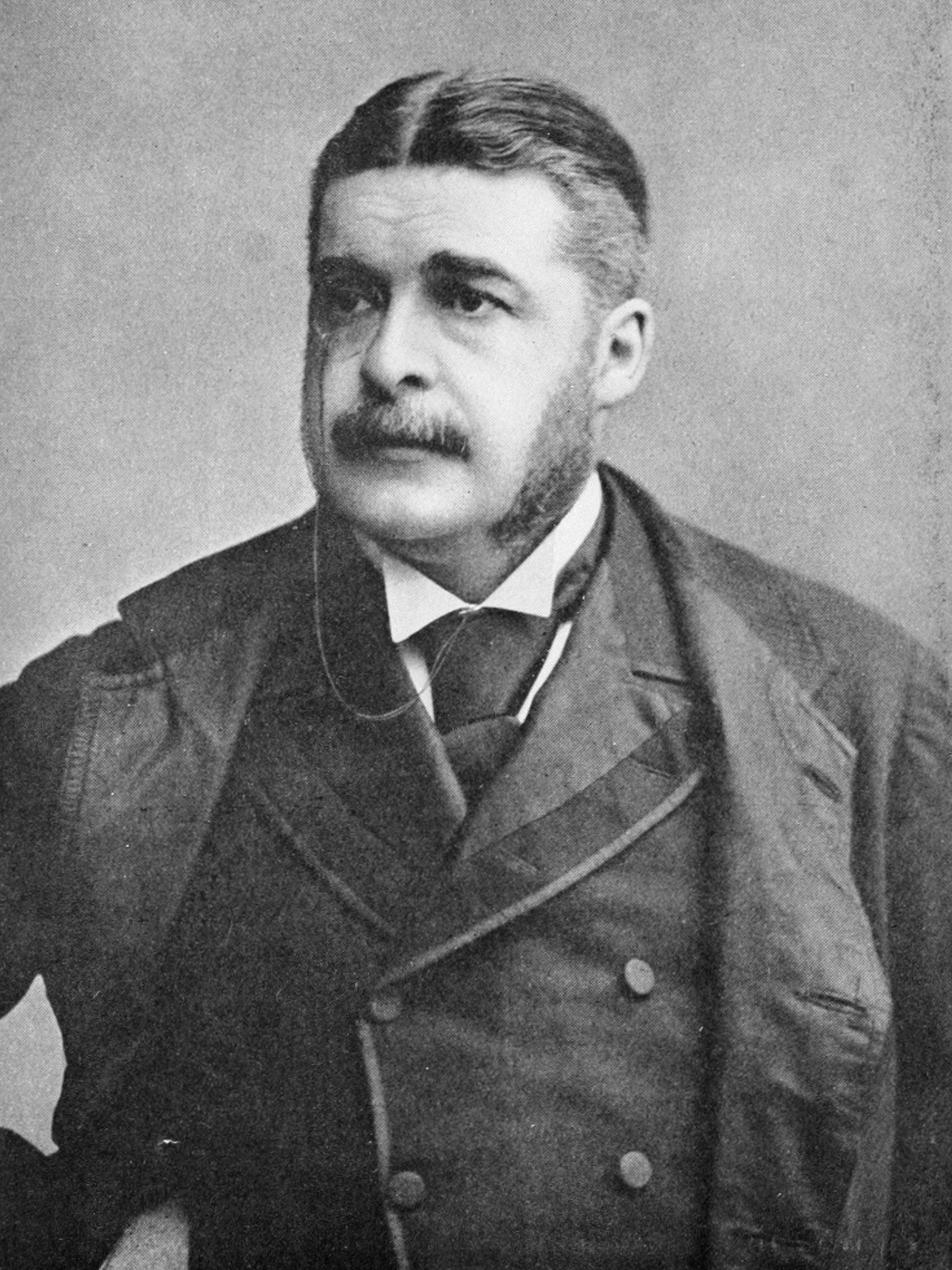
Sir Arthur Sullivan

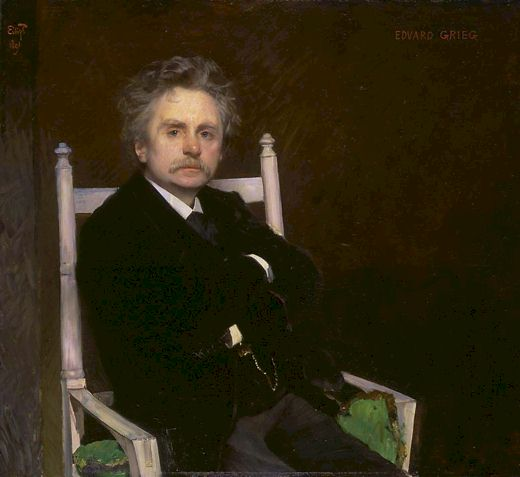
Edvard Grieg

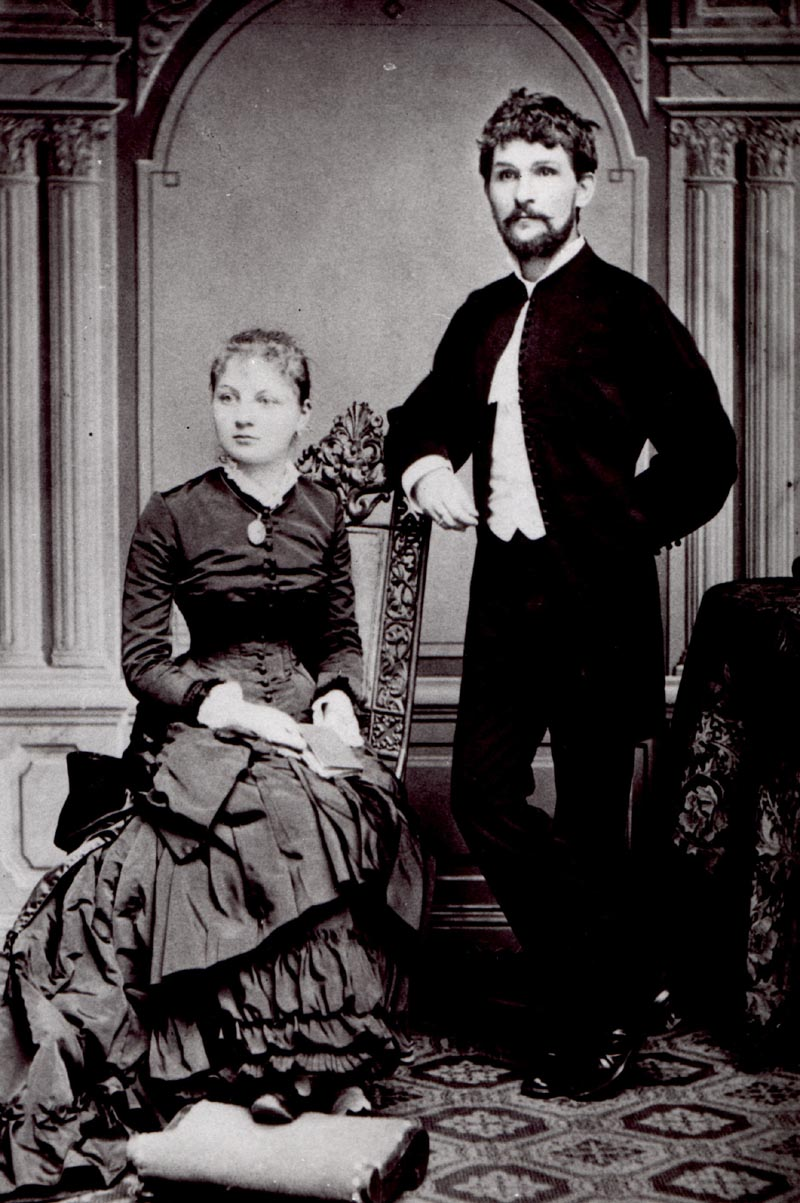
Leoš Janáček

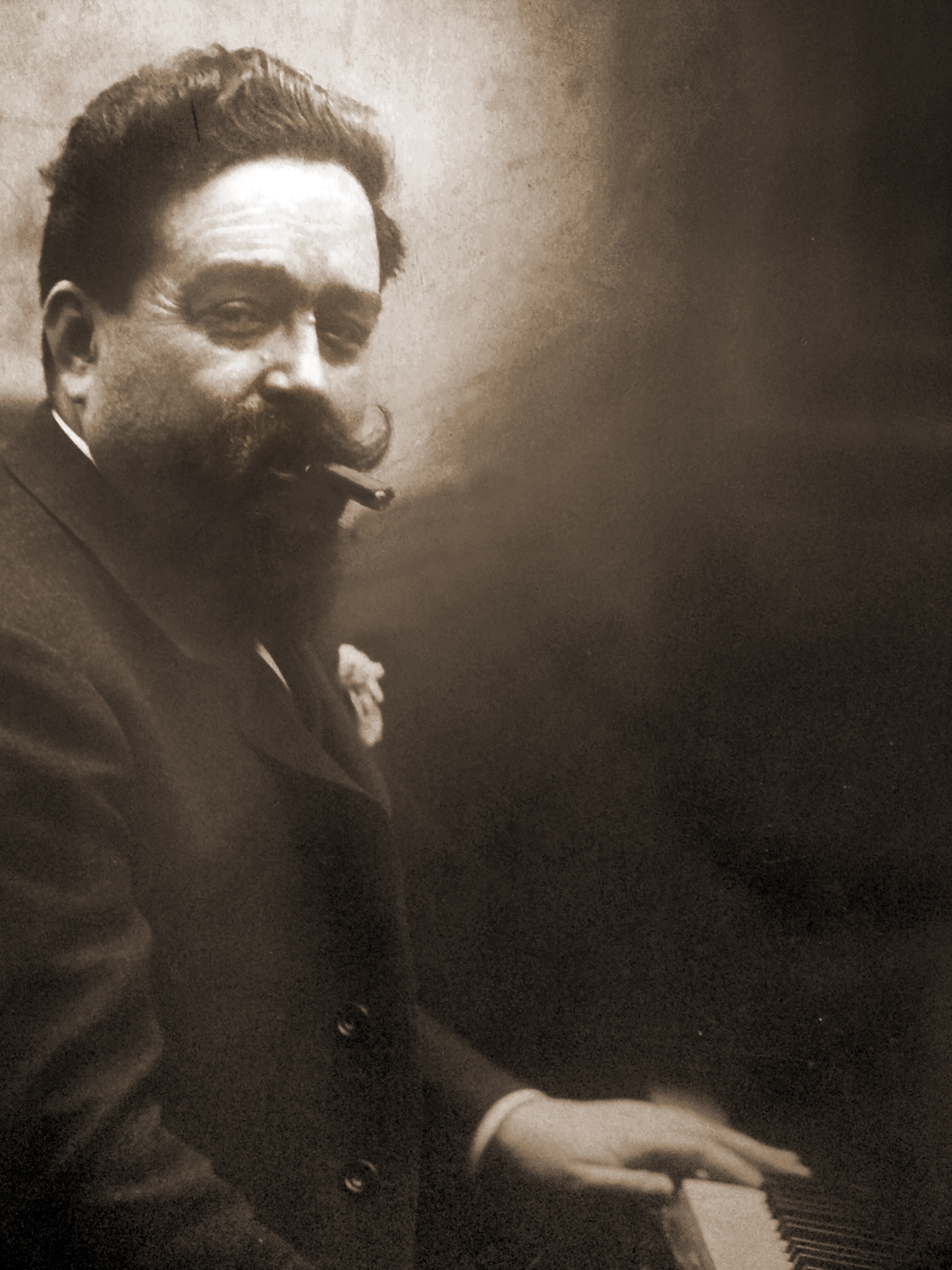
Isaac Albéniz

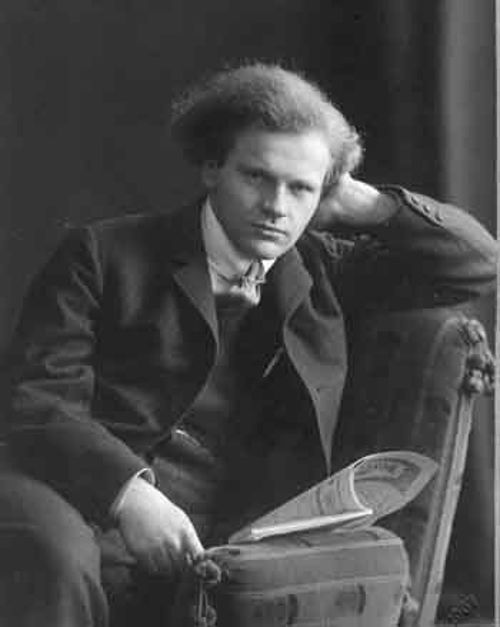
Wilhelm Backhaus

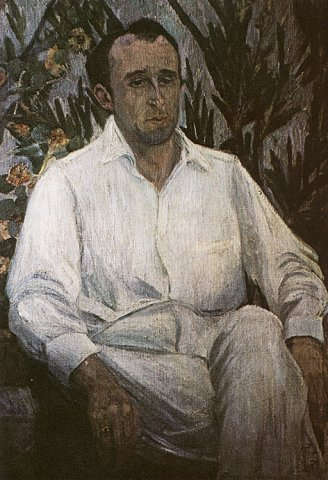
Frederick Delius

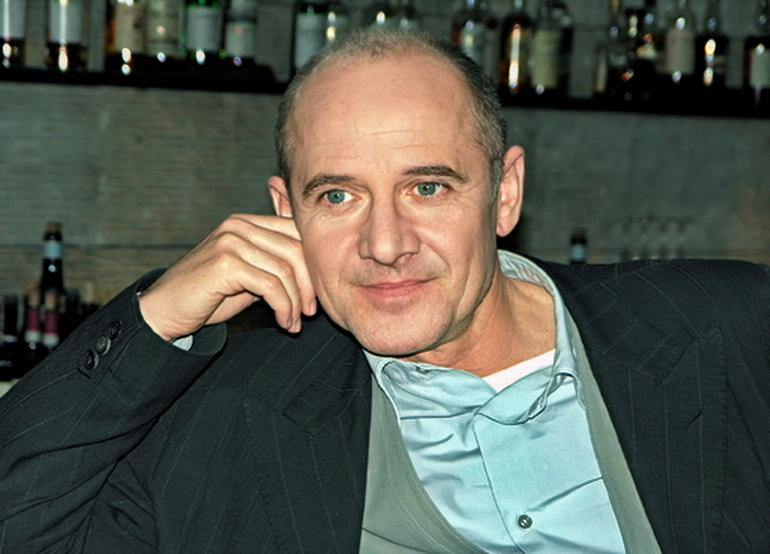
Ulrich Mühe

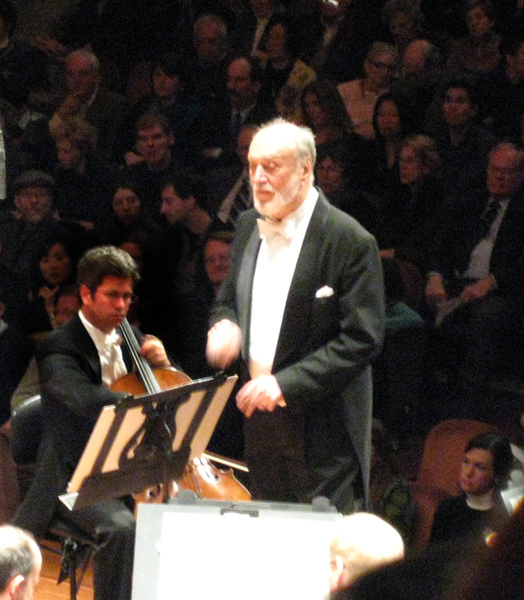
Kurt Masur

This is an assortment of notable alumni: (See also Category:University of Music and Theatre Leipzig alumni)

- Isaac Albéniz (1860–1909), Spanish composer and pianist
- Algernon Ashton (1859–1937), British composer and pianist
- Wilhelm Backhaus (1884–1969), German pianist
- Matthias Bäcker (born 1971), German oboist
- Friedrich Baumfelder (1836–1916), German conductor, composer, and pianist
- Lena Belkina (born 1987), Ukrainian mezzo-soprano
- Herman Berlinski (1910–2001), German-born American composer, organist, pianist, musicologist and choir conductor
- Sina Berlinski née Goldfein (1910–2011), German-born American pianist and piano teacher
- Georg Christoph Biller (1955–2022), Thomaskantor
- Rudolf Bockelmann (1892–1958), German baritone
- Ulrich Böhme (born 1956), German organist
- Gerhard Bosse (1922–2012), German violinist and conductor
- Sir Adrian Boult (1889–1983), English conductor
- Gonzalo Brenes (1907–2003), Panamanian composer, musicologist, music educator, civil servant, and politician
- Emil Büchner (1826–1908), German conductor and bandmaster
- Ferruccio Busoni (1866–1924), Italian pianist and composer
- George Whitefield Chadwick (1854–1931), American composer, of the 'Second New England School'
- Mikalojus Konstantinas Čiurlionis (1875–1911), Lithuanian composer and painter
- Frederick Delius (1862–1934), English composer
- Hugo Distler (1907–1942), German composer and church musician
- Matthias Eisenberg (born 1956), German organist
- Frank-Michael Erben (born 1965), German violinist
- Martin Flämig (1913–1998), German choir director, Protestant state-church music director, cantor of the Dresdner Kreuzchor
- Gertrude Förstel (1880–1950), studied piano, but was remembered as soprano
- Wolfgang Fortner (1907–1987), German composer, composition teacher and conductor
- Götz Friedrich (1930–2000), German director
- Albert Fuchs (1858–1910), Swiss-German composer, conductor, academic, and critic
- Leo Funtek (1885–1965), violinist, conductor, arranger and music professor
- Didia Saint Georges (1888–1979), Romanian composer
- Matthias Goerne (born 1967), German singer
- Edvard Grieg (1843–1907), Norwegian composer
- Juozas Gruodis (1884–1948), Lithuanian composer and conductor
- Jakob Grün (1837–1916), Austrian violinist
- Ludwig Güttler (born 1943), German trumpeter
- Johannes Helstone (1853–1927), Surinamese composer, pianist and writer.
- Leota Henson (1866–1955), American piano accompanist for the Fisk Jubilee Singers
- Peter Herrmann (1941–2015), German composer
- Alfred Hill (1869–1960), Australian composer, conductor and teacher
- Joseph Hirschbach (1860–1897), Musical Director, Tivoli Opera House, San Francisco
- Leoš Janáček (1854–1928), Czech composer
- Karl-Heinz Kämmerling (1930–2012), German piano teacher
- Sigfrid Karg-Elert (1877–1933), German composer
- Hermann Keller (1885–1967), German church musician and musicologist
- Simone Kermes (born 1965), operatic soprano
- Paul Klengel (1854–1935), German violinist, pianist, composer
- Freya Klier (born 1950) German author, director
- Robert Köbler (1912–1970), German university organist
- Franz Konwitschny (1901–1962), German conductor
- Sebastian Krumbiegel (born 1966), German pop singer
- Tobias Künzel (born 1964), German pop singer
- Harry Kupfer (1935–2019), German impresario
- Soo Jung Kwon (born 1979), Pianist, educator, musician
- Rosemarie Lang (1947-2017), German singer
- David Le Vita (1906-2006), American musician, musicologist, conductor and educator
- Christel Loetzsch (born 1986), German mezzo-soprano
- John Lund (1859—1925), German-born American conductor and composer
- Mykola Lysenko (1842–1912), Ukrainian composer, pianist and music educator
- Anne Macnaghten (1908–2000), British violinist and pedagogue
- Carl Adolf Martienssen (1881–1955), German pianist and music educator
- Kurt Masur (1927–2015), German conductor
- Erhard Mauersberger (1903–1982), German organist, music teacher, cantor of the Thomanerchor
- Rudolf Mauersberger (1889–1971), German choir director and composer, cantor of the Dresdner Kreuzchor
- Ulrich Mühe (1953–2007), German actor
- Irina Pauls (born 1961), German choreographer
- Tom Pauls (born 1959), German actor and cabaret artist
- Günther Ramin (1898–1956), German organist, choir director and composer
- Karl Richter (1926–1981) German choir director, conductor, harpsichordist, organist
- Hugo Riemann (1849–1919), German music theorist, music historian, music educator and music lexicographer
- Sofie Rohnstock (1875–1964), Austrian composer
- Miklós Rózsa (1907–1995), Hungarian American Hollywood film composer
- Richard Sahla (1855–1931) Austrian violin virtuoso, conductor and composer
- Émile Sauret (1852–1920), French violin virtuoso and composer
- Steffen Schleiermacher (born 1960), German composer and pianist
- Annerose Schmidt (1936–2022), German pianist
- Michael Schönheit (born 1961), German organist and conductor
- Christoph Schroth (born 1937), German director
- Erwin Schulhoff (1894–1942), Czech composer and pianist
- Hans-Joachim Schulze (born 1934), German Bach scholar
- Christian Sinding (1856–1941), Norwegian composer
- Ethel Smyth (1858–1944), English composer
- Peter Sodann (born 1936), German actor
- Ralf Stabel (born 1965), German theatre scholar / dance scholar
- Anna Diller Starbuck (1868–1929) composer and pianist
- Fritz Steinbach (1855–1916), German conductor
- Sir Arthur Sullivan (1842–1900), English composer
- Bertha Tapper (1859–1915), Norwegian pianist and editor
- Klaus Tennstedt (1926–1998), German conductor
- Siegfried Thiele (born 1934), German composer
- Kurt Thomas (1904–1973), German composer and choir director
- David Timm (born 1969), German pianist, organist, choral conductor and jazz musician
- Jürnjakob Timm (born 1949), German cellist
- Nadja Uhl (born 1972), German actress
- Helmut Walcha (1907–1991), German organist and harpsichordist
- Amadeus Webersinke (1920–2005), German pianist and organist
- Felix von Weingartner (1863–1942), Austrian conductor, composer, pianist and writer
- Wilhelm Weismann (1900–1980) German composer and musicologist
- Johannes Weyrauch (1897–1977), German composer
- Louise Collier Willcox (1865–1929), American author, editor, anthologist, translator, suffragist
- Heinz Wunderlich (1919–2012), German organist, academic and composer
- Ruth Zechlin (1926–2007), German composer, organist

=== Notable faculty ===
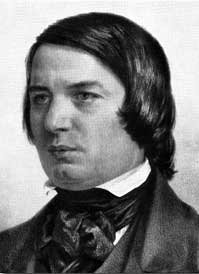
R. Schumann

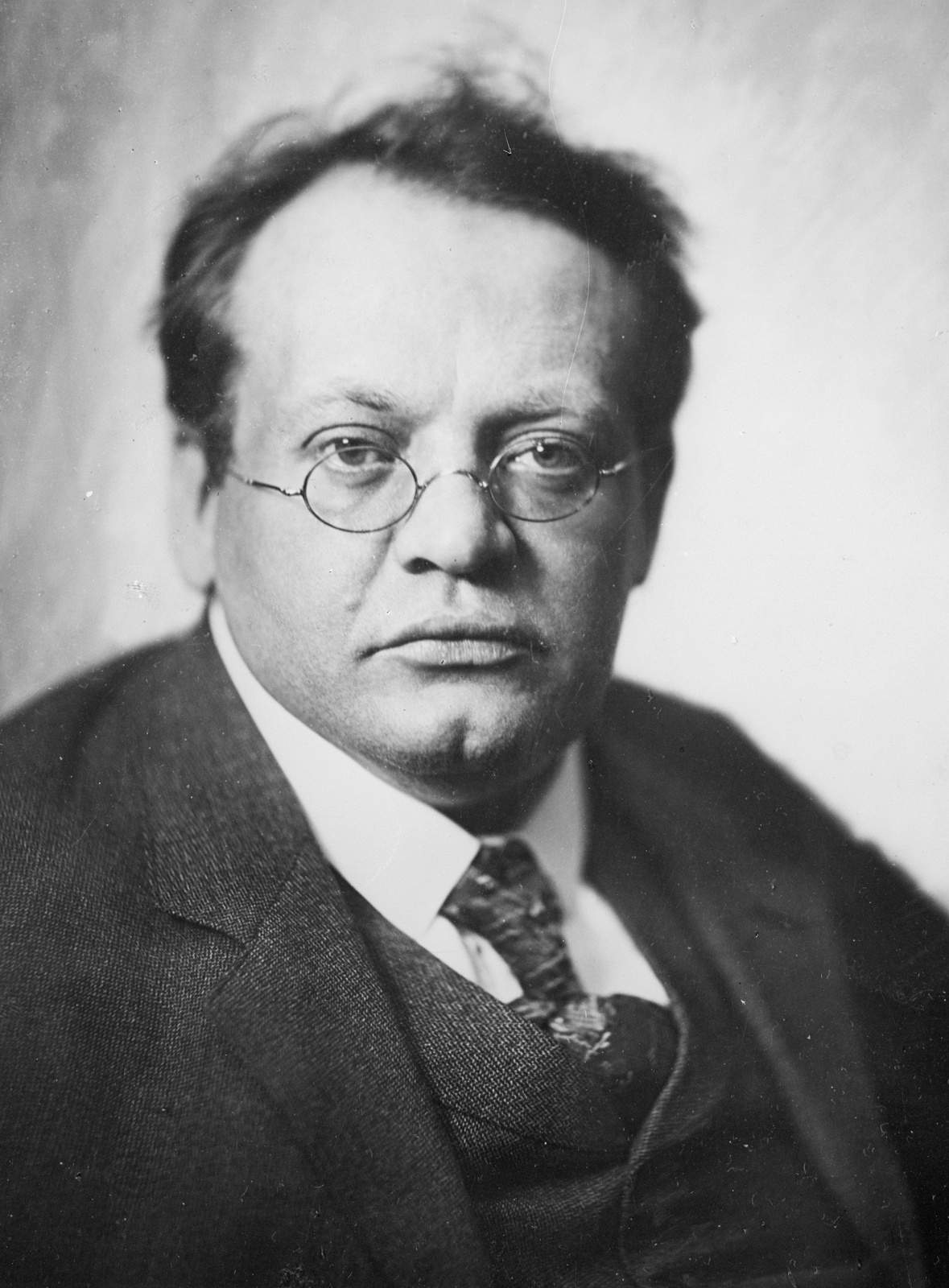
Max Reger

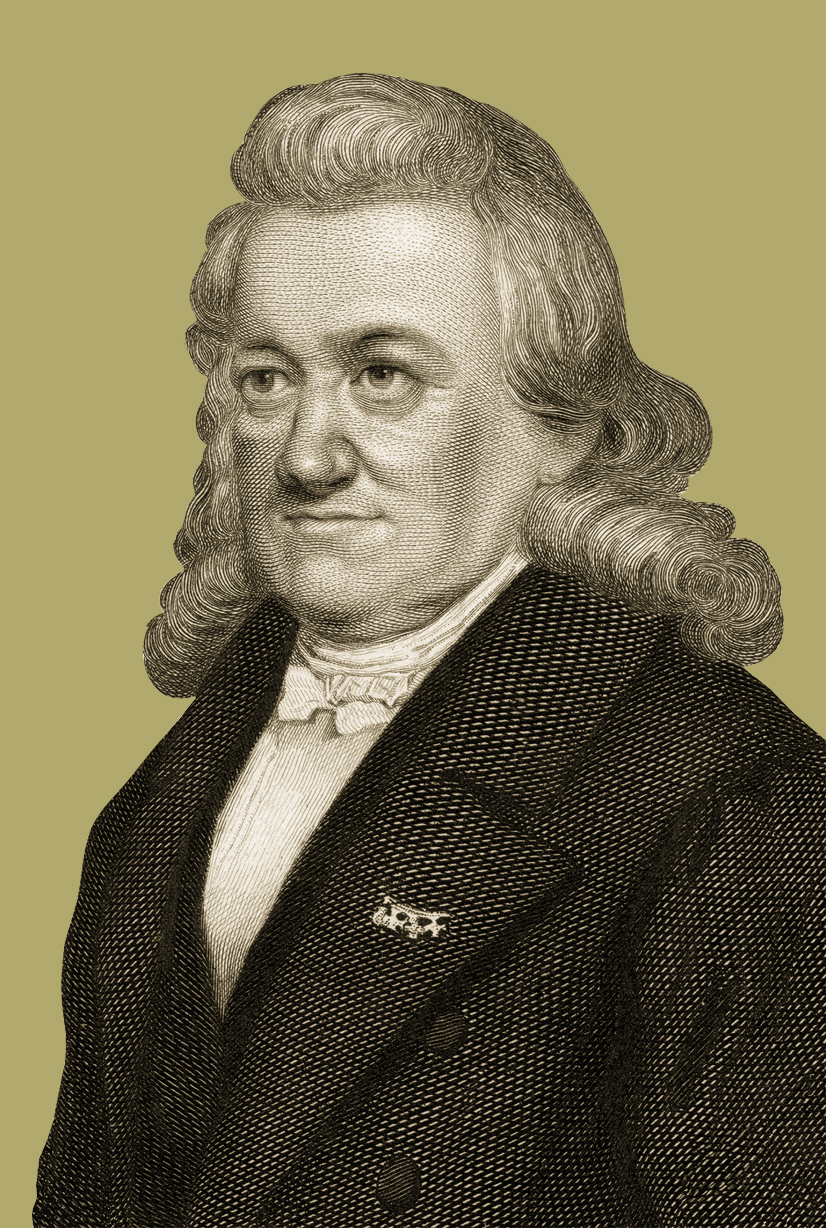
Friedrich Schneider

- Adolph Brodsky (1851–1929), Russian violinist, later Principal of the Royal Manchester College of Music
- Ferdinand David (1810–1873), German violin virtuoso and composer
- Johann Nepomuk David (1895–1977), Austrian composer
- Karl Davydov (1838–1889), Russian cellist
- Niels Gade (1817–1890), Danish composer
- Friedrich Grützmacher (1832–1903), German cellist
- Moritz Hauptmann (1792–1868), German composer and writer; Thomaskantor
- Diethard Hellmann (1928–1999), German organist and choral conductor
- Peter Herrmann (1941–2015), German composer
- Salomon Jadassohn (1831–1902), German composer
- Sigfrid Karg-Elert (1877–1933), German composer
- Julius Klengel (1859–1933), German cellist
- Paul Klengel (1854–1935), German violinist, pianist, composer
- Kolja Lessing (born 1961), German violinist, pianist, composer and academic teacher
- Fabien Lévy (1968– ), Composer
- Kurt Masur (1927–2015), German conductor
- Felix Mendelssohn Bartholdy (1809–1847), German composer, pianist and Music Director of the Leipzig Gewandhaus Orchestra; Founder
- Ignaz Moscheles (1794–1870), Bohemian composer and piano virtuoso
- Oscar Paul (1836–1898), German musicologist and writer
- Günther Ramin (1898–1956), German composer, organist, cembalist, conductor, Thomaskantor
- Max Reger (1873–1917), German composer, conductor, pianist and organist
- Carl Reinecke (1824–1910), Danish composer, conductor, and pianist
- Julius Rietz (1812–1877), German cellist, composer and conductor
- Ernst Friedrich Richter, German music theorist; Thomaskantor
- Wilhelm Rust, German musicologist and composer; Thomaskantor
- Richard Sahla (1855–1931) Austrian violin virtuoso, conductor and composer
- Friedrich Schneider (1786–1853), German composer and conductor
- Gustav Schreck, German music educator and composer; Thomaskantor
- Clara Schumann (1819–1896), German pianist, teacher, and composer
- Robert Schumann (1810–1856), German composer, aesthete and influential music critic
- Hans Sitt (1850–1922), German violinist and composer
- Karl Straube, German Organist and choral conductor; Thomaskantor
- Wolfgang Unger (1948–2004), choral conductor, director of Leipziger Universitätsmusik

== Institute of Church Music ==
The Institute of Church Music (Kirchenmusikalische Institut) was refounded 1992. The institute has a prominent role in Germany because of Max Reger (1873–1916), Kurt Thomas (1904–1973) and Günther Ramin (1898–1956). It offers programs in church music, chorus conduction and organ. It offers research masters in those subjects as well.

The Institute of Church Music was founded by Karl Straube (1873–1950) in 1921 and 1926 it became part of the Saxon Evangelical-Lutheran Church.

== Administration ==
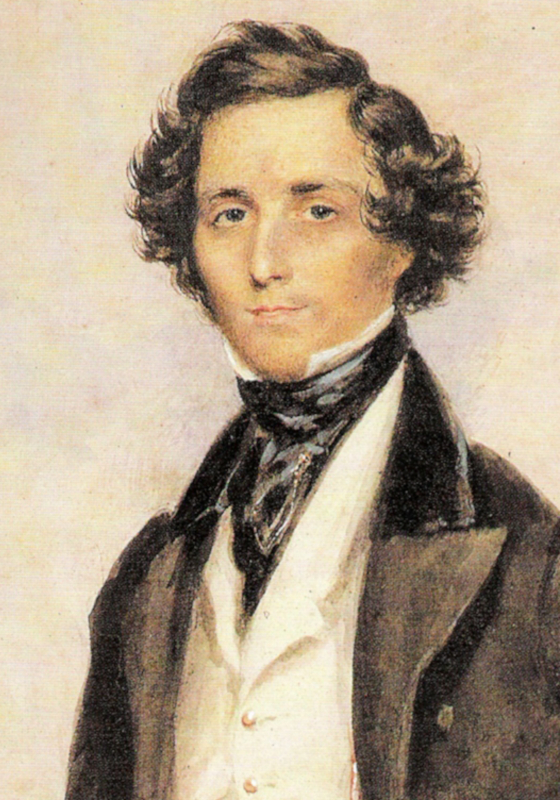
Felix Mendelssohn

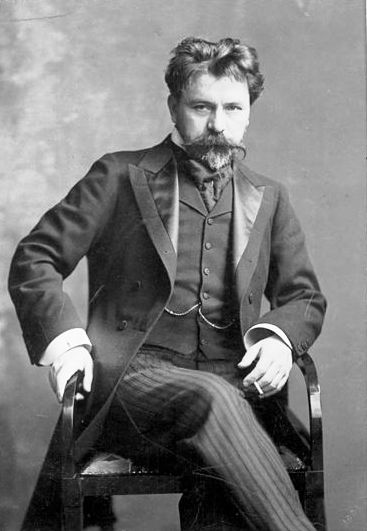
Arthur Nikisch

Rectors of the university:

- 1843–1847: Felix Mendelssohn (1809–1847)
- 1849–1881: Heinrich Conrad Schleinitz (1805–1881)
- 1881–1897: Otto Günther (1822–1897)
- 1897–1902: Carl Reinecke (1824–1910)
- 1902–1907: Arthur Nikisch (1855–1922)
- 1907–1924: Stephan Krehl (1864–1924)
- 1924–1932: Max Pauer (1866–1945)
- 1932–1942: Walther Davisson (1885–1973)
- 1942–1945: Johann Nepomuk David (1895–1977)
- 1945–1948: Heinrich Schachtebeck (1886–1965)
- 1948–1973: Rudolf Fischer (1913–2003)
- 1973–1984: Gustav Schmahl (1929–2003)
- 1984–1987: Peter Herrmann (1941–2015)
- 1987–1990: Werner Felix (1927–1998)
- 1990–1997: Siegfried Thiele (born 1934)
- 1997–2003: Christoph Krummacher (born 1949)
- 2003–2006: Konrad Körner (born 1941)
- 2006–2015: Robert Ehrlich (born 1965)
- 2015–2020: Martin Kürschner (born 1954)
- 2020– : Gerald Fauth (born 1959)

== Departments ==
=== Bologna process ===
Since 1999 the school is adapting to the Bologna process. As of 2008 the adjustment to the Bachelor's degree and Master's degree system is being organized. The education program with major in school music is since the winter term of 2006/07 already adapted to the Bologna process and as such leads to a bachelor's degree. The programs of the Institute of Church Music were changed to the beginning of the winter term 2008/09 and until the winter term of 2010/2011 all programs have to be adapted to the Bologna process.

=== Orchestra ===
The school has its own symphony orchestra under the conduction of Ulrich Windfuhr until 2013 and Matthias Foremny since 2014.

=== Departments ===
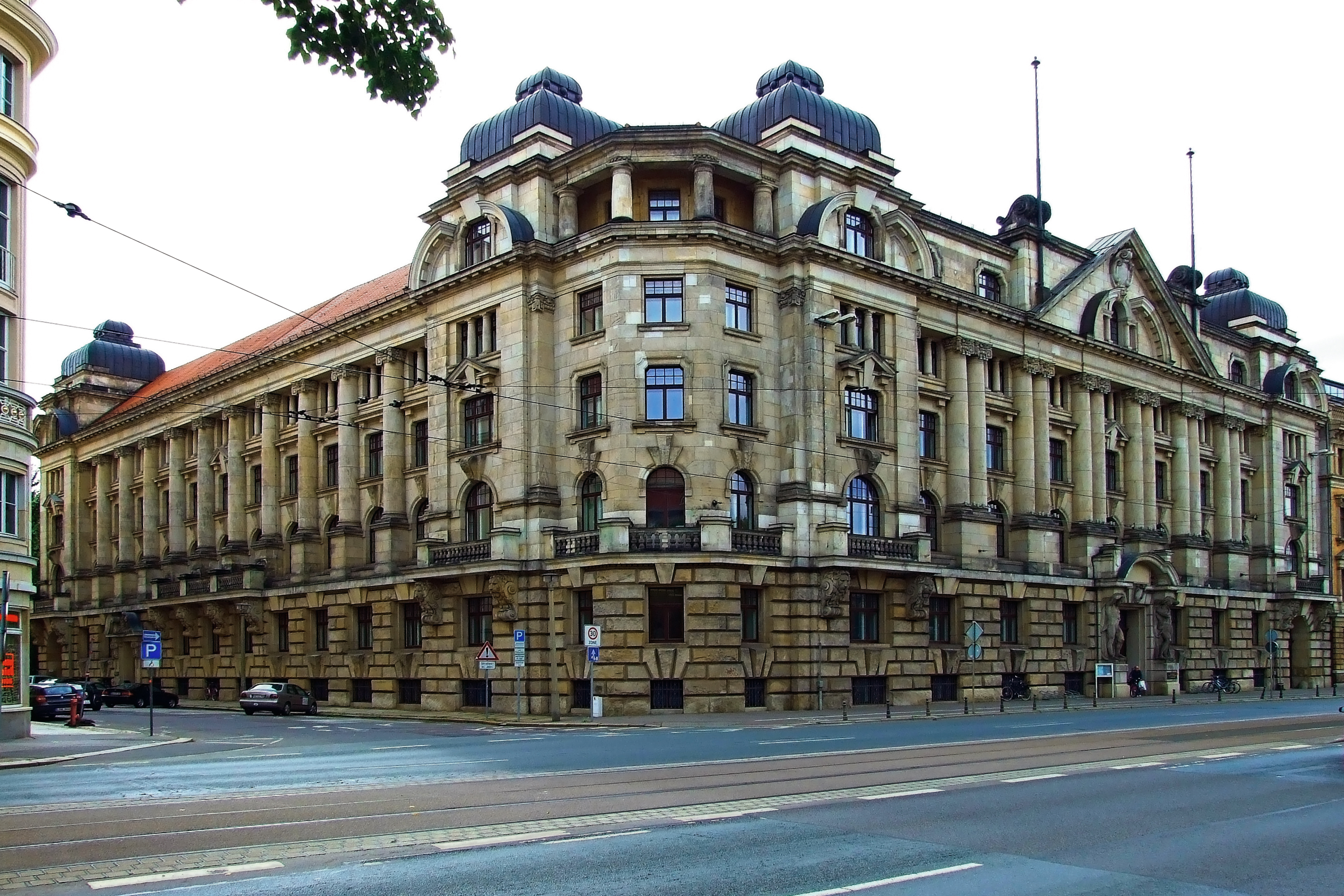
Premises in Dittrichring

- Faculty I
  - Wind instruments and percussion instruments
  - Conducting and correpetition
  - Singing and musical theatre (e.g. opera)
  - String instruments and harp
- Faculty II
  - Early music
  - Piano
  - Musical composition and music texture
  - Musicology, music education and languages
  - School music education
  - Church Music Institute
- Faculty III
  - Dramaturgy
  - Jazz, pop music and musical theater ("musical")
  - Acting

== Students ==
A total of 813 students were enrolled at the college in 2007 (375 males and 438 females). There were 260 (32%) international students enrolled at the time. They come above all from Poland, Russia, South Korea and China. Thirteen of them are scholarship holders of the German Academic Exchange Service, this makes the school the best one on the scholarship holders list out of every German Music Colleges.

=== Contests ===
The Felix Mendelssohn College of Music and Theatre organizes many music contests. The Lions-Club Leipzig hosts the Albert-Lortzing-Förderpreis Singing Contest with a €2,500 prize. Furthermore, the college organizes a contest for ensembles and the recognized Young Concert Artists European Auditions together with the Young Concert Artists (YCA), New York. The school leads among all German colleges of music with a total of 470 public events yearly.

== See also ==
- Music schools in Germany
- Architecture of Leipzig – Italian Neorenaissance

== Sources ==
- Todd, R. Larry (2003). Mendelssohn – A Life in Music. Oxford; New York: Oxford University Press. ISBN 978-0-19-511043-2.
- Werner, Eric (1963). Mendelssohn, A New Image of the Composer and his Age. New York; London: Free Press of Glencoe. OCLC 479241019.
