= Carolina Eyck =

German theremin player (born 1987)

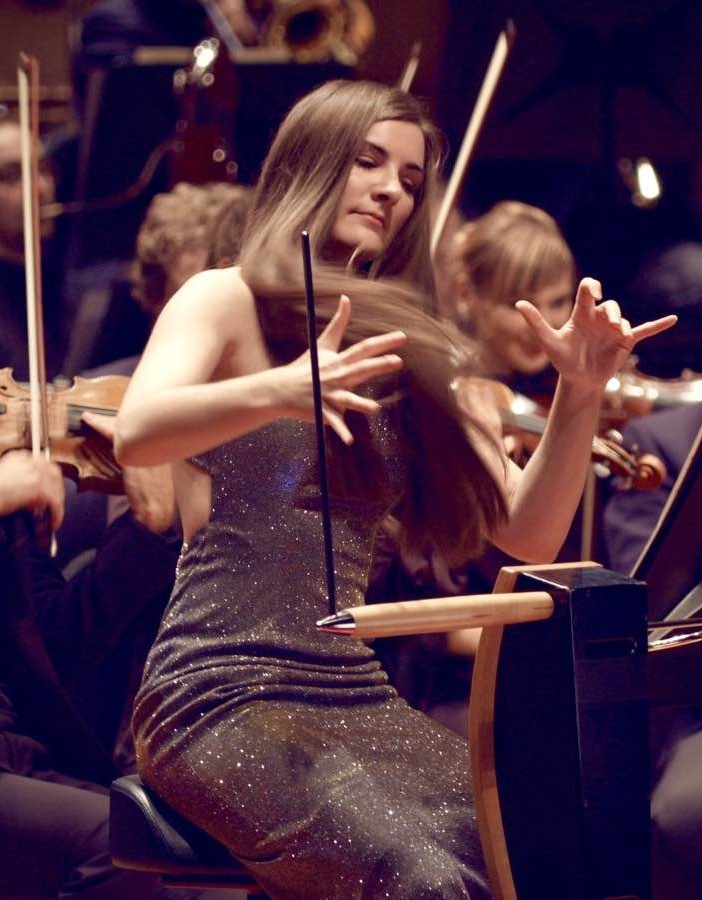
- Eyck playing the theremin

Background information
- Born: 26 December 1987 (age 38); Near Berlin, Germany
- Genres: Classical, electronic, contemporary classical
- Occupations: Musician, composer, author, mentor
- Instruments: Theremin, viola, piano, vocals
- Website: carolinaeyck.com

Carolina Eyck (born 26 December 1987) is a German-Sorb musician, composer, author and mentor who specialises in playing the theremin.

== Biography ==
Eyck was born in 1987, near Berlin, Germany. She is a member of the Sorbian community of East Germany.

Eyck began learning piano aged five and violin aged six. She was introduced to the theremin at the age of seven by her parents, and started getting lessons with Lydia Kavina, a niece of Leon Theremin, the inventor of the instrument.

Eyck studied music at a school for musically gifted children Musikgymnasium Carl Philipp Emanuel Bach. In this time she performed with, among others, the Deutsche Streicherphilharmonie.

In 2007 Eyck moved to Sweden to study viola at the Royal College of Music, Stockholm. After three years of study under Henrik Frendin, she graduated with a Bachelor of Music degree in the instrument in 2010.

=== Career ===
Eyck made her debut as a thereminist in the Berliner Philharmonie in 2002, when she was 14 years old.

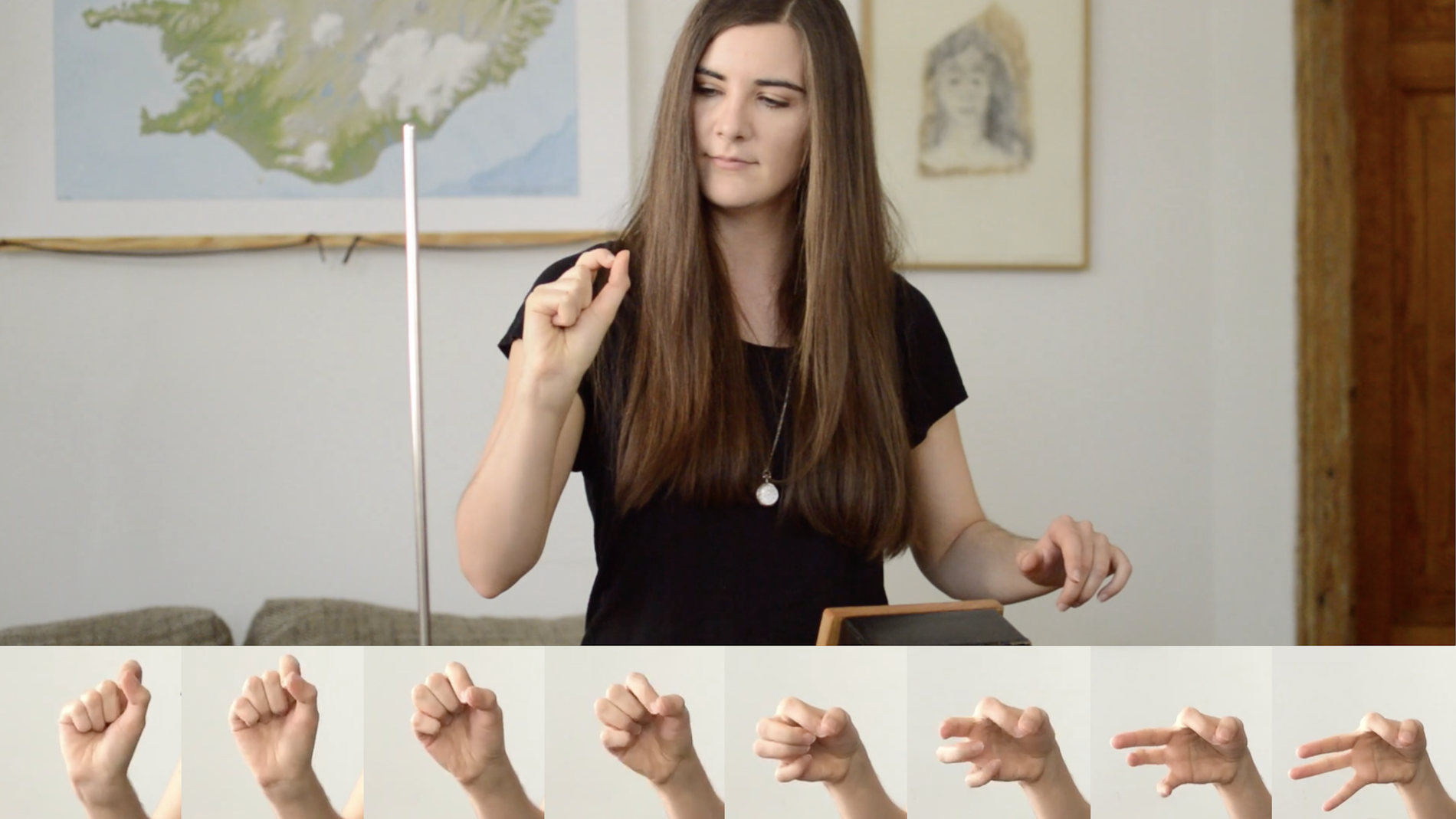
"8 finger position technique" invented by Eyck

At the age of 16, Eyck invented a new and precise way to play the theremin, called the "8 finger position technique". With this new technique the player is able to tune the electromagnetic field of the theremin to their hand and rely on their finger positions, rather than correcting notes after they are audible. In 2006, aged 18, she published a book The Art of Playing the Theremin in English and German, in which she explains this method, that is now being used by thereminists around the world.

Eyck has featured in several Lera Auerbach's compositions and ballets, such as Icarus, which she performed at the Kennedy Center in Washington, D.C., in 2010, Cinderella, which she performed at the Finnish National Ballet in 2011, and The Little Mermaid, which she played as a guest musician of the Hamburg Ballet touring Japan in 2009 and San Francisco Ballet Orchestra in 2010. In 2017 Eyck premiered some of Auerbach's Preludes for Theremin and Piano in Cuba.

In 2011 Andrew Norman wrote Eyck a theremin Concerto Air which she performed with the Heidelberg Philharmonic Orchestra in the same year. In 2012, Eyck played the theremin solo at the world premiere of the two symphonies Mesopotamia and Universe by Fazıl Say.

Finnish composer Kalevi Aho dedicated the theremin concerto Eight Seasons to her, which she performed for the first time in Rovaniemi in October 2012 with the Lapland Chamber Orchestra. The recording of the concerto won an Echo Klassik in the category "Concert Recording of the Year" in 2015. The concerto has since been revisited by Eyck with different orchestras, including Argentine National Symphony Orchestra in Buenos Aires (2017), Württembergische Philharmonie in Reutlingen (2021), and most notably the BBC Philharmonic with direction by John Storgårds at the Royal Albert Hall in London in 2022.

Since 2013, Eyck has collaborated and performed with pianist and composer Christopher Tarnow, resulting two first ever sonatas written for theremin and piano, 1st Theremin Sonata (2013) and 2nd Theremin Sonata (2014) as well as albums Improvisations for Theremin and Piano (2014) and Theremin Sonatas (2015). Together they have played at festivals Festival Mitte Europa and the Caramoor Summer Music Festival in New York, as well concert halls such as Centro Gabriela Mistral in Santiago (2016), Teatro Filodrammatici in Milan (2019), and Centro Botín in Santander, Spain (2025).

In 2018, theremin concerto Dancefloor with Pulsing by French composer Régis Campo was written for Eyck and premiered with the Brussels Philharmonic. She has since performed it with various orchestras including Frankfurt Radio Symphony in 2020, Estonian National Symphony Orchestra in Tallinn (2024), WDR Funkhausorchester in Cologne (2024), Orchestre National de France in Paris (2024) with direction by Cristian Măcelaru, and Deutsches Symphonie-Orchester Berlin in 2025.

In 2019 Eyck premiered Sirens, a concerto for theremin and orchestra composed by Dalit Warshaw, with Boston Modern Orchestra Project and conducted by Gil Rose.

Eyck first travelled to Australia in January 2017 to perform classical music, including Rachmaninoff's Vocalise, with pianist Jennifer Marten-Smith and Midnight Oil's guitarist Jim Moginie at the Mona Foma in Hobart, Tasmania. In May 2025 Eyck embarked on her first national tour in Australia Theremin & Beyond with the Australian Chamber Orchestra and pianist Tamara-Anna Cislowska. Composer Holly Harrison was commissioned to write a new piece of music as part of the orchestra's 50th Anniversary celebrations, resulting in Hovercraft for Theremin and Chamber Orchestra.

Eyck's cross-genre collaborations include working and performing with Gotye, Jeff Mills, Samy Deluxe and Steve Vai.

==== Teaching ====
In 2010 Eyck started as the artistic director of various Theremin Academies. She has conducted workshops, lectures and master classes in Germany, France, Sweden, Poland, Great Britain, the United States of America, Mexico and Japan, expanding on the ideas of her original invention of the "8 finger position technique", building on its foundations and defining and researching new vocabulary for students and professionals. Eyck has also published tutorial videos online in multiple languages.

In 2018, she gave a TEDx Talk about the symbiosis of self-control and freedom while playing the theremin.

==== Composer ====
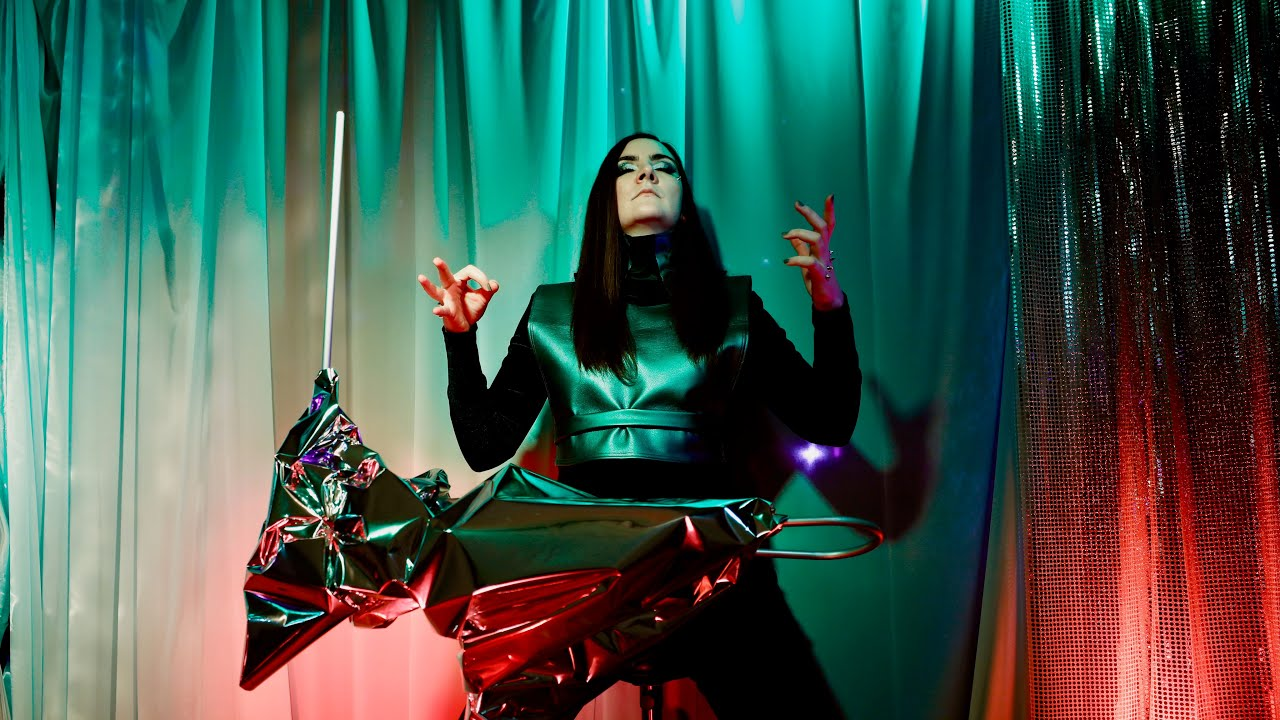
Eyck playing on the music video "Elliptic Orbit"

Eyck has been composing her own music throughout her career. Her work spans from orchestral compositions such as award-winning Sciciani (2006), Remembrance (2020) and Ocean Light (2025) to more experimental electronic sounds resulting in albums Waves (2019) and Thetis 2086 (2022), the latter being constructed in 3D sound and presented in Dolby Atmos.

In 2016, Eyck began touring her solo Theremin & Voice program, where she uses a surround sound system to fill the performance space with loops and layers developed on stage. The style of the performance balances between minimal and progressive electronic music. Eyck's original compositions and improvisations led to albums Elephant in Green (2019) and Elegies for Theremin & Voice (2019).

Since 2023 Eyck has become immersed in the world of film scoring, where she uses theremin, electronics, voice and viola as her mediums. She has written the score for Confessions of a Good Samaritan (2023, Netflix) and Wild Inside (2026, HBO) by Penny Lane.

== Honors and awards ==
Eyck received the first prize in the prestigious German youth composition competition Jugend komponiert in 2005 with the composition Physikalische Formeln.

In 2006 Eyck won the first prize with an orchestral composition Sciciani for accordion in the International Competition for Composers, presented by Radio/TV Berlin-Brandenburg, a prestigious competition for young composers.

In 2015, Eyck received the German Echo Klassik in the category "Concert Recording of the Year (20th/21st century music)" for playing the Theremin Concerto Eight Seasons by Kalevi Aho, conducted by John Storgårds and played with the Lapland Chamber Orchestra.

== Compositions ==
- Sciciani—Am wendischen Burgwall, Pictures for Accordion and Strings, world premiere 16 September 2006 by the Cottbus Philharmonic Orchestra directed by GMD Reinhard Petersen, Soloist: Aidar Gainullin (Moskau)—Bajan
- CIANI—Am wendischen Burgwall, Pictures for Theremin and Orchestra, world premiere 4 February 2007 by the orchestra of the Musikgymnasium Carl Philipp Emanuel Bach (specialized high school for musicians) in the French Cathedral, Berlin
- Sonina for theremin and harp (2008)
- Sauselei, duet for viola and voice (2010)
- Syllableaves, concerto for theremin and orchestra, world premiere 24 April 2010 by the Gävle Symphony Orchestra directed by Fredrik Burstedt at the Konzerthaus Gävle (Sweden)
- Elefant in Green for theremin and voice (2010)
- Maskenreich for theremin and organ (2013)
- Song for Birds for theremin and Jazz Band (2015)
- Fantasias for theremin and string quartet (2015)
- Soliloquy for theremin and voice (2016)
- Delphic for theremin and voice (2017)
- Reja for theremin and voice (2018)
- Eternity for theremin and voice (2018)
- On Wings of Light and Time for theremin, voice and electronics (2019)
- Northern Lights for theremin and electronics (2020)
- Remembrance for theremin and orchestra (2020)
- Elliptic Orbit for theremin and elektronics (2021)
- Midnight Theremin for theremin and Loop Station (2022)
- Frozen Reflections for theremin and delay (2025)
- Ocean Light for theremin and orchestra (2025)

== Discography ==
=== Albums ===
- Theremin (2008, Servi)
- Kalevi Aho (2013, BIS) with Annu Salminen, John Storgård, and the Lapland Chamber Orchestra
- Improvisations for Theremin and Piano (2014, Butterscotch Records) with Christopher Tarnow
- Theremin Sonatas (2015, Genuin) with Christopher Tarnow
- Fantasias for Theremin and String Quartet (2016, Butterscotch Records)
- Waves (2019, yeyeh) with Eversines
- Elegies for Theremin & Voice (2019, Butterscotch Records)
- Thetis 2086 (2022, Neue Meister)

=== Singles and EPs ===
- Reja (2018, self-release)
- Elephant in Green (2019, self-release)
- Northern Lights (2020, self-release)
- Re: Riverine (2024, Neue Meister) with Clemens Christian Poetzsch and Reentko Dirks

=== Guest contributions ===
- Oboe Fantasy by Heinz Holliger (2005, medici arts)
- Dante's Dream (2009, Kick The Flame) – track "Episodes"
- The Little Mermaid (2011, BFMI) – as the voice of the mermaid using theremin
- Cellosophy (2012, Timezone) – track "King of Atlantis"
- Mesopotamia & Universe by Fazıl Say (2013, Imaj)
- The Invention of Love (Die Erfindung der Liebe) film score by Maciej Sledziecki (2013)
- Clownwise (Klauni) film score by Petr Ostrouchov (2013, Fog'n'Desire Films)
- Yeni Şarkılar by Fazıl Say (2015, Ada Music) – tracks 1, 2, and 4
- About April by Friend 'n Fellow (2015, Doctor Heart Music) – track "April"
- Hochkultur Vinyl Abo by Samy Deluxe (2023, Vertigo Berlin) – track "Yves Klein"
- Sirens by Dalit Hadass Warshaw (2025, BMOP/sound)
- Chopin Residue by Mariusz Szypura (2025, Black Element Label) – track 5 "Prelude Op. 28, No. 4"

== Books ==
- Carolina Eyck: The Art of Playing the Theremin ISBN 3-933757-08-8; German: Die Kunst des Thereminspiels ISBN 3-933757-07-X. Both: SERVI Verlag, Berlin 2006
