= The Art of the Theremin =

Studio album by Clara Rockmore
- Released: 1977 (LP), 1981 (LP, Japan), 1987 (CD)
- Recorded: 1977
- Genre: Early electronic, classical
- Length: 43:30
- Label: Delos
- Producer: Robert Moog, Shirleigh Moog

Clara Rockmore chronology
The Art of the Theremin (1977)	Clara Rockmore's Lost Theremin Album (2006)

The Art of the Theremin is the first official album by theremin virtuoso Clara Rockmore, and the only one released in her lifetime. It was produced by Robert Moog and his first wife, Shirleigh Moog, and was released as an LP in 1977 by Delos International Records. As with most of her live performances, she was accompanied by her older sister, Nadia Reisenberg, on piano. The 1977 Delos LP and 1981 Japanese Delos LP release were entitled Theremin. The 1987 Delos CD was titled The Art of the Theremin.

== Track listing ==
No	Track name	Time	Original work	Composer
1.	Vocalise	3:44	Fourteen songs, op. 34, no. 14. Vocalise	Rachmaninoff
2.	Song of Grusia	4:15	Six songs, op. 4, no. 4. Не пой, красавица, при мне (Ne poy, krasavitsa, pri mne) ("Do Not Sing to Me, Fair Maiden" or "Sing not, O Lovely One"). This is also known as "Song of Grusia", Грузия (Gruziya) being the Russian for Georgia	Rachmaninoff
3.	The Swan	2:56	Le carnaval des animaux ("The Carnival of the Animals"), no. 13. Le cygne ("The Swan")	Saint-Saëns
4.	Pantomime	3:44	El amor brujo ("The Bewitched Love"), no. 11. Pantomima ("Pantomime")	de Falla
5.	Hebrew Melody	5:22	Hebrew Melody, op. 33	Achron
6.	Romance	4:45	Concerto for violin no. 2 in D minor, op. 22, II. Romance	Wieniawski
7.	Berceuse	3:06	Жар-птица (Zhar-ptitsa) ("L'oiseau de feu" or "The Firebird"), XX. Berceuse (“Lullaby”)	Stravinsky
8.	Habanera	2:41	Vocalise – étude en forme de habanera ("Vocalise – Study in the Form of a Habanera" [Cuban dance]), M.51	Ravel
9.	Berceuse	4:12	Eighteen pieces for piano, op. 72, no. 2. Berceuse (“Lullaby”): Andante mosso	Tchaikovsky
10.	Valse Sentimentale	2:06	Six pieces for piano, op. 51, no. 6. Valse sentimentale (“Sentimental Waltz”) in F minor	Tchaikovsky
11.	Sérénade mélancolique	2:06	Меланхолическая серенада (Melankholicheskaya serenada) ("Sérénade mélancolique" or "Wistful serenade") in B♭ minor, op. 26	Tchaikovsky
12.	Chant du Ménestrel	4:00	Chant du ménestrel ("Song of the Minstrel"), op. 71	Glazunov

== Personnel ==
- Clara Rockmore – theremin
- Nadia Reisenberg – piano
- Robert Moog, Shirleigh Moog – producers
- Michael Colina – audio engineer
