= Natasha Theremin =

Russian musician (born 1948)

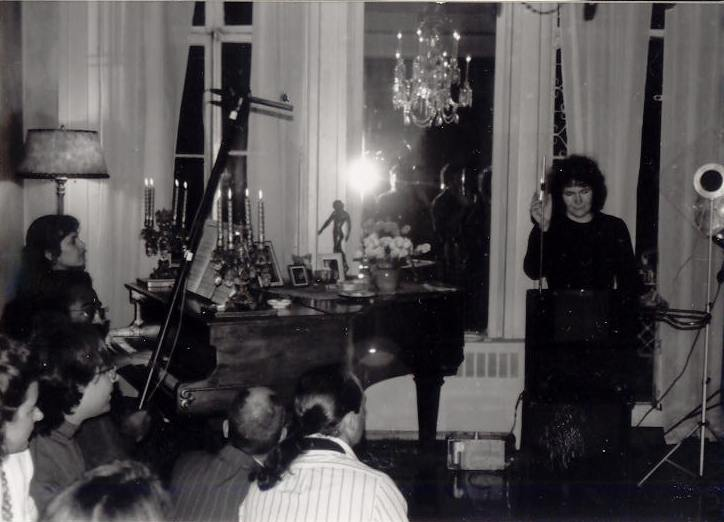

Background information
- Born: Natasha Theremin; 24 June 1948 (age 78); Russian SFSR, USSR
- Genres: Classical music, electronic music
- Occupation: Musician
- Instrument: Theremin

Natalia Lvovna Termen (Russian: Наталья Львовна Термен; born 24 June 1948), better known as Natasha Theremin, is a Russian musician.

== Early life ==
She is the daughter of Russian scientist, musician and inventor Léon Theremin and Maria Feodorovna Theremin (Gushchina). Her father invented the theremin, the instrument in which she specialized, in 1919.

Theremin received her first music lessons as a child from her father, who accompanied her on the piano. She graduated from the School of the Moscow Conservatory and the Gnessin Academy with a specialty in teaching piano.

== Career ==
Beginning in the late 1970s, she began to develop new techniques on how to play the theremin, and became one of the few prominent concert performers on this instrument at the time.

Natasha Theremin introduced the instrument configuration that uses the edge of the palm. One octave fits between the open and closed positions of the hand. These settings were favored by performers such as Carolina Eyck, Masami Takeuchi and Lydia Kavina.

Continuing the innovations of Lev Theremin, Natasha created new interpretations of classical works, including "Swan" by Saint-Saens, "Daisies" and "Vocalise" by Sergei Rachmaninoff and "Concerto for voice" by Glier. She performed contemporary music for the theremin, written especially for her (such as "Fantasia for theremin and organ" by S. Archer, "Melody for theremin" by Vorontsov). She held concerts in Moscow, Leningrad, Kazan, Vilnius, Tallinn and was involved in the filming of documentaries.

During joint visits with her father, Natasha Theremin demonstrated the theremin at the festival in Bourges, (France) and the concert program of the International Computer Music Festival in Stockholm (Sweden, 1990), New York University, the University of Berkeley (US, 1991) and during the award to Leo Theremin in the "Academy of light" in The Hague (Holland, 1993).

On September 25, 1991, at Stanford University, a concert was held in honor of Lev Theremin, in which Natasha, accompanied by electronic music pioneer Max Mathews, performed Rachmaninoff's "Vocalise".

Léon Theremin created a series of concerts for the tube theremin especially for Natasha. Under her guidance, Russia attempted to create the world's first theremin concert on a modern technology base. The tool was presented at festivals in France, Lithuania and Sweden.

After her father's death, Natasha stopped concerts. She resumed public activity in 2013, performing at the Festival Theremin in the Central Museum of Musical Culture in Moscow.

In 2016 and 2019 she toured Hamamatsu, Tokyo and Kyoto.

Natalia was the co-organizer of the international festival of theremin culture, Thereminology, and curator of the Russian Theremin School (the only theremin school in Europe and Russia).

== See also ==
- Electronic musical instrument
- Synthesizer
