= Peter Theremin =

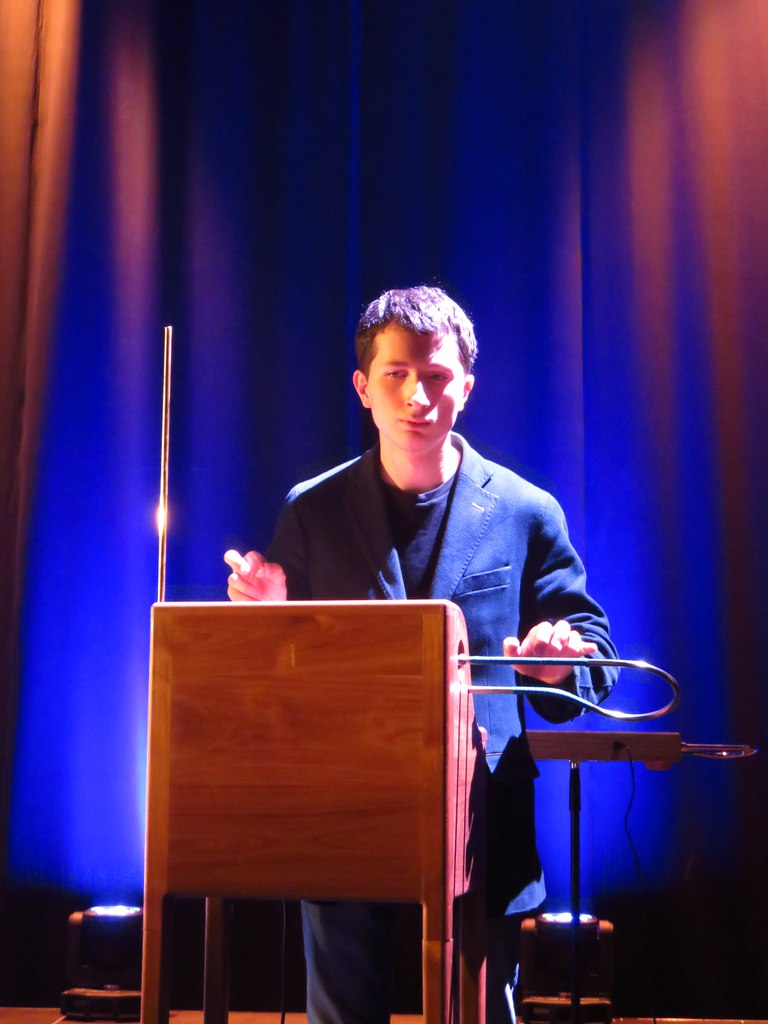
- Peter Theremin plays theremin

Background information
- Born: Peter Theremin; 19 June 1991 (age 35); Moscow, Russia
- Genres: Classical music, electronic music
- Occupation: Musician
- Instrument: Theremin

Peter Theremin is a Russian composer and performer on the theremin, an electronic musical instrument.

== Life and career ==
Peter Theremin is the great-grandson of Leon Theremin, and is himself a thereminist – a player of the instrument his grandfather invented. He plays classical and contemporary improvised music.

He is organizer of "Thereminology" — a festival devoted to the theremin and its cultural impact – and the creator of the Russian-language website Theremin Times, now called Theremin Today. He is the head of Theremin Family School, and is the author of a series of lectures on the history of electro music, and the theremin. He create the course "Theremin in 24 hours".

== Guest Records ==
- Polo & Pan 22:22 ( Petite Etoile) ( 2025)
- Ryder The Eagle Smile, Hearse Driver! ( 2025)
- Apply - Lost in Space ( 2025)
- The Owls Are Not What They Seem: David Lynch Tribute Remixes (2017)
- Varvara Vizbor "Forbidden Fruit" (2015)
- Sergey Babkin "Muzasfera" (2018)
- Panama (Igor Grigoriev) - "Saints" (2018)
- Tatiana Alyoshina "How we flew on a balloon" (2013)

== Music for films ==
- A Requiem in Bishkek ( India - France) directed by Di Sica Ray ( 2026)
- Vygotsky ( Russia) - ( theremin part) Director Anton Bilzho
- "Participation" (2021)
- Theremin Party for the VR game M1n0t0r (France) (2021)
- Lessons of Auschwitz (dir. Denis Semionov, Webby Award 2020)
- VITEBSK ART SCHOOL for at the Centre Pompidou (Paris) and Jewish Museum, (New York) directed by Lesya Matsko (2018)
- Valse de Vladimir (2018) (France, directed by Matthew Martin)
- Sounds of Vladivostok (theremin part) (2017)[3] (Russia - Cyprus, directed and composed by Marios Elia)
- In the Shadow of Red October ( BBC)
- The Sheep Islands (2015)

== Awards ==
- Laureate of the International Film Festival "Fathers and Children" in the nomination "film music" (2017)
- Special grant for teachers from the television contest "Blue Bird"
- Silver medal of the British award Creativepool for music for the film "Lessons of Auschwitz" (2020)
- Bronze of the American Clio Awards (English) rus. 2021 for the music for the film "Lessons of Auschwitz".

== Sources ==
- Strelávina, Daria (3 November 2015). "Thereminology: From Lenin to Led Zeppelin". Russia Beyond the Headlines.
