= Nadia Reisenberg =

American pianist and teacher (1904–1983)

- Born: 14 July 1904; Vilnius, Russian Empire
- Died: 10 June 1983 (aged 78); New York, U.S.
- Occupation: Pianist

Nadia Reisenberg Sherman (14 July 1904 – 10 June 1983) was an American pianist.

== Biography ==
Nadia Reisenberg was born in Vilnius on 14 July 1904 to a Jewish family. Her parents were Aaron and Rachel Reisenberg. Her sister Anna (Newta) was born two years later, and Clara in 1911 who later took the married name of Clara Rockmore and became renowned for her virtuosity on the theremin. The three sisters remained extremely close. When Nadia was six, her uncle Paul sent the family a piano, and Nadia immediately knew she would be at the keyboard for the rest of her life. Her talent demanded that the family move to St. Petersburg for study at the conservatory, where the director, famed composer Alexander Glazunov, took a special interest in the gifted girl. She studied under Leonid Nikolayev at the Saint Petersburg Conservatory.

Due to the upheavals of the October Revolution, Reisenberg and her family returned to Vilnius, then traveled to Warsaw and Germany. They finally settled in New York in 1922. She then pursued further studies with Josef Hofmann at the Curtis Institute in Philadelphia, from which she graduated with a degree in piano performance. She had a successful career as a concert pianist and taught piano on the faculties of several institutions, including the Curtis Institute, the Juilliard School, Queens College, and the Mannes College of Music.

Her son, Robert Sherman, taught courses on "The Business of Music" at Juilliard and previously wrote music criticism for The New York Times for four decades.

== Death ==
Reisenberg died in 1983 at the age of 78 in New York City.

== Music career ==
Reisenberg gave concerts in the 1920s, particularly with her sister Clara Rockmore, but in 1930 went to study again and chose Josef Hofmann as a tutor. Reisenberg's most important concert activity took place in the 1940s. She was especially praised for her series of concerts encompassing all the piano concertos by Mozart, played (with Alfred Wallenstein conducting) for WOR, which was broadcast in the 1939/40 season. These concerts "made radio history".

Reisenberg continued to perform until the end of her life, and appeared at Carnegie Hall a total of 22 times. While she usually appeared as a soloist with the New York Philharmonic, she gave two recitals at the venue: an all-Tchaikovsky program on 13 November 1943, in commemoration of the 50th anniversary of the composer's death, and another of unknown repertoire on 21 November 1947. From 1955 to 1983, Reisenberg was a member of the piano faculty of the Mannes School of Music. In later years, Reisenberg taught at the Juilliard School and was a frequent juror for the Leventritt Competition.

== Legacy ==
Reisenberg's sons co-authored a biography on their mother, Nadia Reisenberg: A Musician's Scrapbook (1985). Since 2002, the Nadia Reisenberg Recital Award sponsored by The Nadia Reisenberg & Clara Rockmore Foundation takes place every two years at the Mannes School of Music in New York City.
