= Terpsitone =

Electric instrument invented by Leon Theremin

The terpsitone is an electronic musical instrument, invented by Léon Theremin, which consists of a platform fitted with space-controlling antennae, through and around which a dancer would control the musical performance. By most accounts, the instrument is nearly impossible to control. Of the three instruments built, only the last one, made by Theremin in 1978 for Lydia Kavina, survives today. The instrument was named after the Greek muse of dance, Terpsichore (from the Greek words τέρπω, "delight", and χoρός, "dance").

== See also ==
- Theremin
