= Dalit Warshaw =

American composer, pianist and thereminist (b.1974)

Dalit Hadass Warshaw (born August 6, 1974) is a New York-based composer, pianist, and thereminist. Previously on the composition and music theory faculty of Boston Conservatory, she currently serves on the composition faculty at Juilliard and CUNY-Brooklyn College. Her works have been performed by dozens of orchestral ensembles, including the New York Philharmonic and Israel Philharmonic Orchestras (Zubin Mehta conducting), the Boston Symphony, the Cleveland Orchestra, the Houston Symphony, the Y Chamber Orchestra, the Colorado Symphony and the Albany Symphony Orchestra. In April 2006, her piece After the Victory for orchestra and chorus, was premiered by the Grand Rapids Symphony and the North American Choral Company. Her first recording, entitled "Invocations" was released by Albany Records in 2011. Her first piano concerto, Conjuring Tristan, was commissioned by the Grand Rapids Symphony in 2014. The work was inspired by Richard Wagner's Tristan und Isolde, as well as by Thomas Mann's novella Tristan. The piece received its world premiere in January 2015, with Warshaw as the soloist.

Warshaw obtained a doctorate in music composition from the Juilliard School in 2003, where she taught courses in instrumentation and advanced orchestration in its Evening Division from 2000 to 2005. During the 2003-04 academic year, she served as Visiting Professor of Composition at Middlebury College, and as composer-in-residence at the Bowdoin International Music Festival in July 2004. Her teachers include such notable composers as Samuel Adler, Milton Babbitt, David Del Tredici, and Jacob Druckman.

Warshaw was the recipient of numerous awards and grants include five Morton Gould Young Composers Award from the ASCAP Foundation, two BMI Award for Student Composers (she became the youngest person ever to win the BMI Award in 1984 with her orchestral piece Fun Suite, written at the age of eight), the New Juilliard Ensemble Composers Competition, a Fulbright Scholarship to Israel, a Whitaker Reading by the American Composers Orchestra, and a Charles Ives Scholarship from the American Academy of Arts and Letters. Other awards received include four ASCAP Foundation Grants to Young Composers, the Cincinnati Symphony Orchestra Young Composers Competition, the Juilliard Student Composers Competition and a Fromm Music Foundation Grant from Harvard University. She has held residencies at the Yaddo and MacDowell Artist Colonies and at the Virginia Center for the Creative Arts.

As a pianist, Warshaw has performed widely as both soloist and chamber player, in concert spaces such as Avery Fisher Hall, Miller Theater, the Juilliard Theater, Merkin Hall and Steinway Hall. Her teachers have included Martin Canin, Jonathan Feldman, Yocheved Kaplinsky and Ruti Hadass Warshaw.

Warshaw has also appeared as thereminist with the New York Philharmonic, the American Composers Orchestra, American Symphony Orchestra, the Royal Stockholm Philharmonic, Boston Symphony Orchestra, Boston Modern Orchestra Project, San Francisco Symphony, and with the New York Festival of Song. Having studied theremin with the renowned Clara Rockmore from an early age, she has also performed on the instrument in spaces such as Carnegie Hall, the LA Philharmonic's Disney Hall, and Lincoln Center's Paul Hall, the Juilliard Theater, Alice Tully Hall, and at Bargemusic.

Warshaw was named a 2016 Guggenheim Fellow in April 2016.
