= Three radio theremin =

Musical instrument

The three radio theremin was originally invented by Tomoya Yamamoto. The theremin is constructed by tuning three separate radios to create a system that acts similar to a stand-alone theremin. The circuitry in each individual radio is used to functionally modulate the sound out of the third, producing similar tonal qualities as a theremin.

The following process can be used to produce the same effect:

1. Find three sets of amplitude modulated (AM) radios of superheterodyne receiver type
2. Place set 3 radio between set 1 and set 2
3. Set 1 and set 2 radios tuned to 1145 kHz and set 3 to 1600 kHz so that local oscillators of set 1 and 2 well received by set 3 radio
4. Local oscillator of set 1 and 2 may produce beat sound in set 3
5. Manipulate hand over set 1 antenna to change the frequency of beat sound
6. Volume of beat sound reduced by covering set 3 radio with hand.
