= Nadia Reisenberg Recital Award =

American biennial piano competition

The Nadia Reisenberg Memorial Recital Award is a biennial piano competition held at Mannes College of Music in New York City since 2004.

The competition was established by the Nadia Reisenberg & Clara Rockmore Foundation to honor the memory of Lithuanian-born pianist Nadia Reisenberg who lived in New York City and taught at Mannes.

Candidates are nominated by a panel of judges, and the winner of the competition performs a solo recital at one of the main concert venues in New York City, such as Carnegie Hall or Merkin Concert Hall.

== Winners ==
- 2004: Ying Feng
- 2006: Dudana Mazmanishvili / Ilya Kazantsev
- 2008: Sam Armstrong
- 2010: Vlada Vassilieva
- 2012: Reed Tetzloff
- 2014: Yekwon Sunwoo / Magdalena Mullerperth
