= Denis Semionov =

Russian artist

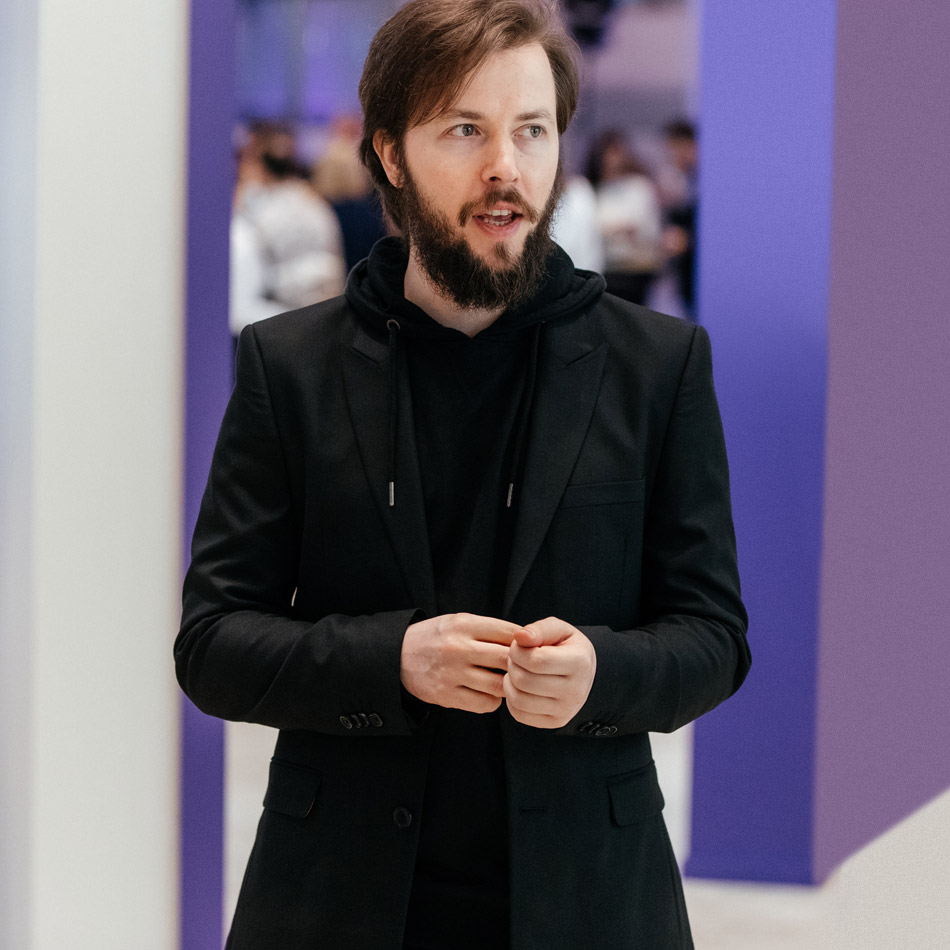
- Born: Denis Semionov; September 29, 1985 (age 40); Moscow, Russia
- Education: Stroganov Moscow State Academy of Arts and Industry; Moscow State Pedagogical University, Moscow
- Known for: Artist

Denis Semionov (Russian: Денис Игоревич Семенов, Denis Igorevich Semenov; born 29 September 1985) - is a Russian and French new media artist.

== Biography ==
Denis Semionov was born in 1985 in Moscow in the artistic family. His great - grandfather was a Russian-Finnish artist and sculptor Leonid Kuzmin. George Kuzmin, Denis’ great - granduncle, was a patron of Russian Futurists and the publisher of the first futuristic book and manifesto A Slap in the Face of Public Taste. In 2002 Semionov graduated from the courses of Stroganov Moscow State Academy of Arts and Industry, in 2007 – art and graphic faculty of Moscow State Pedagogical University, in 2010 - post graduate studies. At the university he worked as an illustrator and designer. After graduating - as a creative director. From 2007-2015 he worked as a teacher of graphic design at the Department of Drawing Geometry of the Moscow State Pedagogical University.

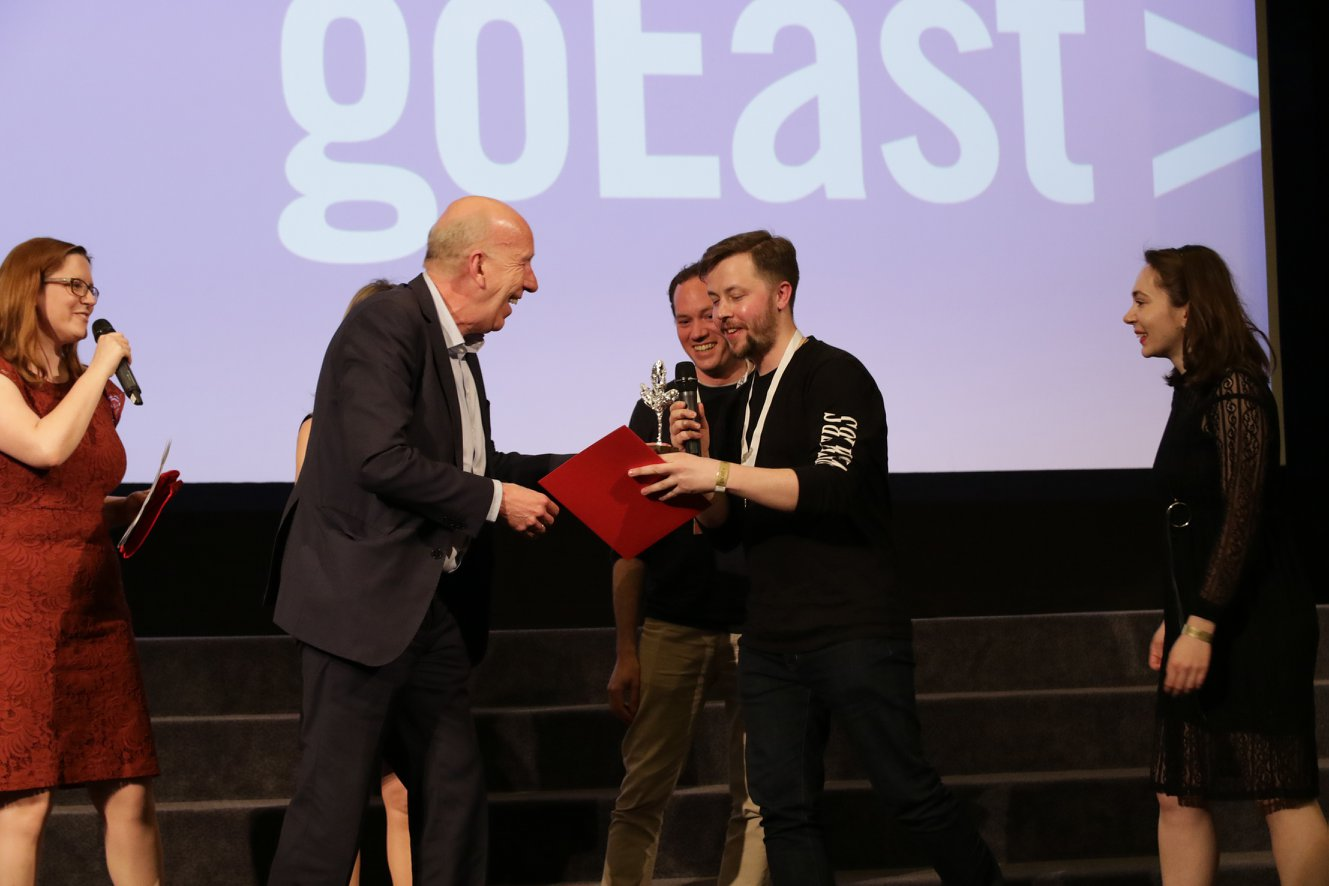
Denis Semionov gets goEast Open Frame Award 2018

== Career ==
Semionov generally works in the field of digital art (virtual art and artificial intelligence art). In 2018 he won grand-prix at Open Frame Award of international film festival goEast for his cinematographic project “The Nominal Empire”, which was drawn in virtual reality. The interactive project combined virtual reality and biomechanics of Vsevolod Meyerhold. In 2019 Denis Semionov became one of five artists who created art pieces during WorldSkills 2019 opening on the 45 000 stadium Kazan arena in collaboration with a speaker Pranav Mistry. The collaboration with Jean-Michel Jarre for the New Year 2021 concert "Welcome to the Other Side", which got 75 million viewers online and in VR, featured illustrative Notre-Dame de Paris made inside virtual reality. From 2023 Denis - is a member of International Academy of Digital Arts and Sciences (IADAS). In 2024 Denis Semionov performed as an artist and a speaker at TEDx Brussels with the AI art installation “Feelings and Sensors”. Semionov collaborated with such musicians and performers as Jean-Michel Jarre, Deborah Frances-White, institutions - Venice Biennale, Institut Français, Arts Council England, Deutsches Filminstitut, Jewish Museum and Tolerance Center, TED (conference), brands – Leica, Samsung, Estée Lauder, Absolut

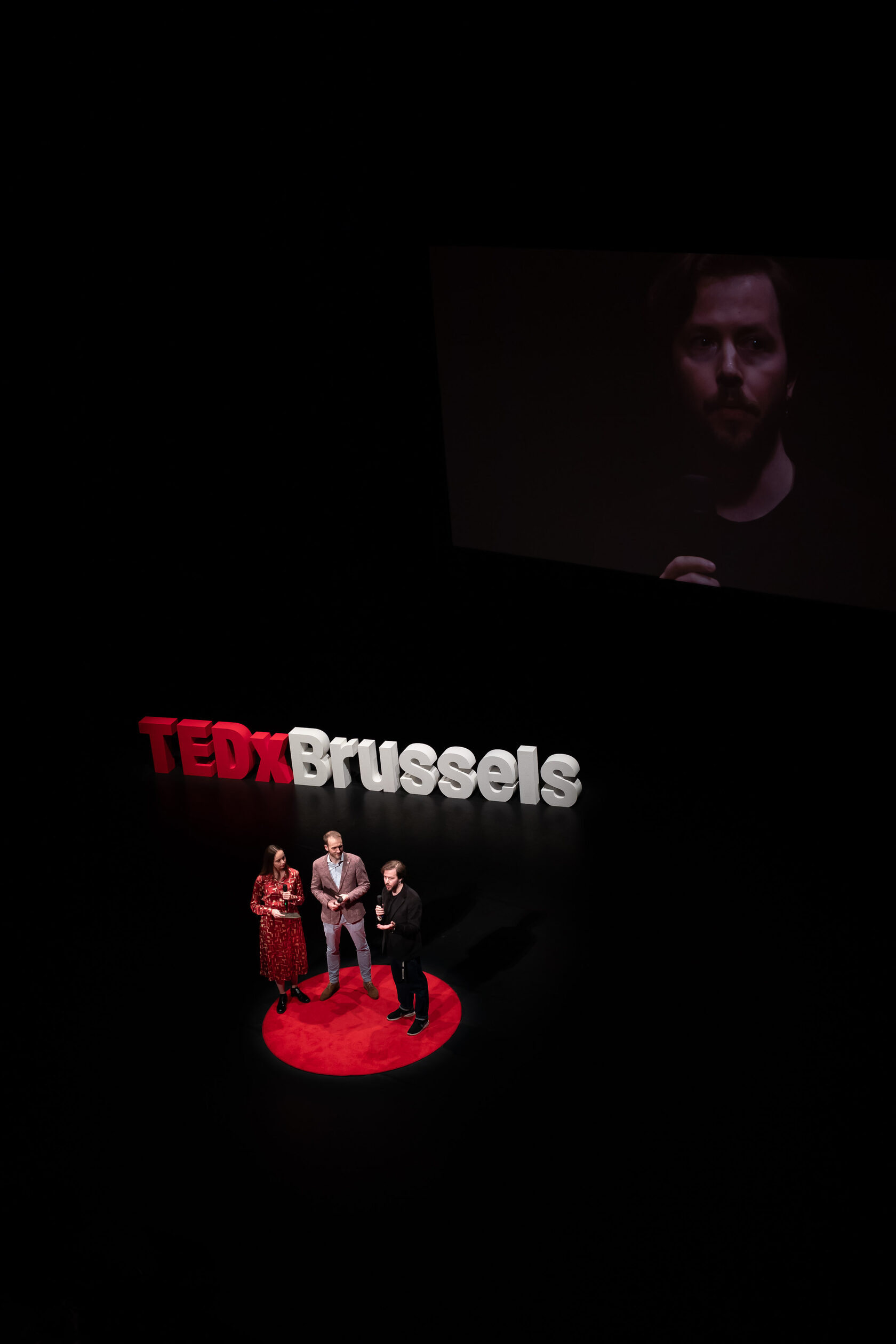
Denis Semionov at TEDxBrussels

== Exhibitions and events ==
- 2025 Panier Futurust — Robineau Gallery, Paris, France
- 2025 [FAM] Futurist Archive in Motion — Robineau Gallery, Moscow, Russia
- 2025 Primairy Forest — Théâtre 121, Casablanca, Morocco
- 2025 Primairy Forest — Soirée immersive animée par la Cie Kérosène, Marrakech, Morocco
- 2025 Primairy Forest — Festival Amazonia del plata – Official selection
- 2025 AI Hokusai: Demons&Monsters — residency and exhibition
- 2024 Into the Wild — TEDxBrussels
- 2024 Feelings and Sensors — FARI institute
- 2024 Prosthetic Reality Vol.2 — Music off the Wall exhibition, The Music Center: Performing Arts Center of Los Angeles, Jerry Moss Plaza, Los Angeles, USA
- 2023 Sound and Machines — Beyond Basel at Art Basel Miami, Miami Beach, USA
- 2023 Odyssey: Villa Circe — Immersive Tech Week
- 2023 South by Southwest
- 2022 Cyber attack: Digital art and activism
- 2022 Lava Land — Ristband Gallery, SXSW, Austin, USA
- 2022 Portland Film Festival — Official selection at Animation short
- 2022 Raindance Immersive — Nomination as Best Immersive Experience, Best Immersive Experience for Social Impact, Discovery Award: Best Debut
- 2021 Prosthetic Reality Vol.2 — NFT and AR artbook
- 2021 Raindance Immersive — Nomination as Best Multiplayer Experience
- 2021 Work in colour — Winzavod Contemporary Art Centre, Moscow, Russia
- 2021 Venice Film Festival — Venice Gap-Financing Market participant
- 2021 New Images Film Festival by Forum des images — Out of competition
- 2021 Welcome to the Other Side by Jean-Michel Jarre — South by Southwest
- 2020 New Images Film Festival by Forum des images — Nomination in XR competition
- 2020 Welcome to the Other Side by Jean-Michel Jarre — Notre Dame de Paris, Paris, France
- 2020 Raindance Immersive — Nomination as Best Multiplayer Experience
- 2020 New Images Film Festival by Forum des images — Performance of the opening
- 2020 Venice Film Festival — Venice VR Expanded
- 2020 Vancouver International Film Festival — Immersed Volumetric XR Market
- 2019 Postreality — 11.12 Gallery, Istra, Russia
- 2019 Culture VR:FR — Powerhouse, Moscow, Russia
- 2019 Experiment — Worldskills, Kazan Arena, Kazan, Russia
- 2019 Avant-garde Upgrade — The Jewish Museum and Tolerance Centre, Moscow, Russia
- 2019 SXSW Edu — Participant
- 2019 NUFF 2019 — SEEK — Participant
- 2018 Avant-garde Lab 2. — The Jewish Museum and Tolerance Centre, Moscow, Russia
- 2018 The Nominal Empire — Royal Institute of Technology, Stockholm, Sweden
- 2018 The Nominal Empire — Museum Wiesbaden, Wiesbaden, Germany
- 2018 Cannes Film Festival (Marche du film) — Participant
- 2017 Moscow International Film Festival — Participant
- 2017 Berlin International Film Festival — Participant
- 2017 MIPTV Media Market — Participant
- 2017 Cannes Film Festival (Marche du film) — Participant
- 2016 Feel Noir — Digital October, Moscow, Russia
- 2015 Feel Noir — Art Basement, Moscow, Russia
- 2015 Eyes — Allure. Best of beauty, Gary Tatintsian Gallery, Moscow, Russia

== Awards ==
- Webby Award - Metaverse, Immersive & Virtual - Best VR Headset Experience - Nomination
- International Documentary Film Festival Amsterdam-ONX+DocLab MoCap Stage
- Emmy Awards - Outstanding Interactive Media: Documentary - Nomination
- The Drum Awards - Technical Innovation of the Year
- Shorty Awards - Animations - Winner
- Promax Awards - Best use of Technology - Silver
- Webby Award - Virtual & Remote (Best Narrative Experience 2021) - Honoree
- Webby Award - Virtual & Remote (Best Performance 2021, Music 2021) - Honoree
- Clio Awards - Bronze - Film Craft (music original)
- Los Angeles Film Awards (LAFA) - Gold - Best Virtual Reality
- Lovie Awards - Gold - Best Narrative Experience
- Webby Award - People`s Voice Winner (News (Immersive and Mixed reality), Volumetric/6 degrees of freedom)
- Red Dot - Best of the Best, Red Dot ("Lessons of Auschwitz")
- Shorty Awards - Winner in Facebook Video, Virtual Reality, Branded Content, Finalist in Storytelling, Long Form Video, Education, Audience Honor in Storytelling, Long Form Video, Virtual Reality, Branded Content
- Epica Awards - Silver - Media
- Creative Pool - Bronze - Post Production, Silver - Application, Bronze - Branded Content, Silver - Publishing, Bronze - Photography
- Creative Pool - Bronze - Post Production
- New York Festivals - Bronze - Video Art and Experimental film (Short Film)
- GoEast Open Frame Award - Grand Prix as the best VR Experience
- Epica Awards - Silver - Digital

== Public speaking and performances ==
- Middle Tennessee State University: AI and the Future of Art Summit 2025: Creativity Reimagined
- TEDxBrussels “Into the Wild”
- Stereopsia Europe
- Open Innovations
- 45th WorldSkills, Kazan, Russia
- TEDxYakimankaSalon «Art+Tech», (speakers: Denis Semionov, Olga Sviblova), Jewish Museum and Tolerance Center, Moscow, Russia
- Condé Nast Digital Day, Moscow, Russia
