= Clara Rockmore =

Lithuanian violinist and thereminist (1911–1998)

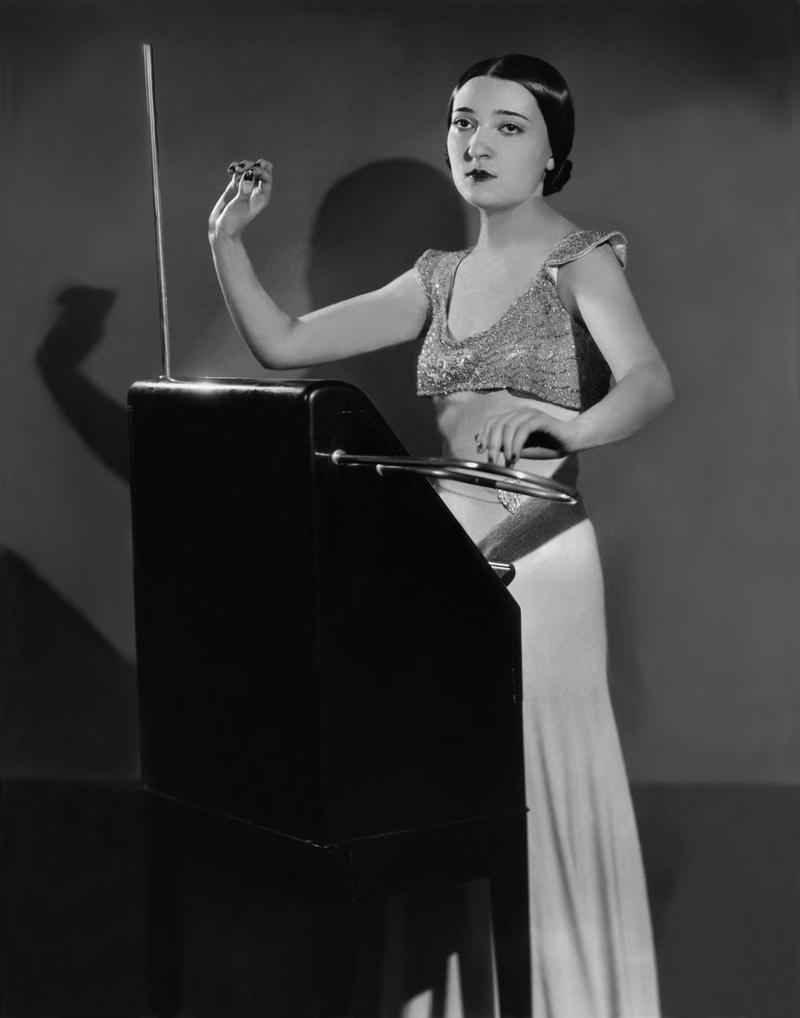
- Rockmore in 1932

Background information
- Born: Clara Reisenberg; 9 March 1911; Vilnius, Russian Empire
- Died: 10 May 1998 (aged 87) New York City, U.S.
- Genre: Classical music
- Occupation: Musician
- Instruments: Violin, theremin

Clara Reisenberg Rockmore (née Reisenberg; 9 March 1911 – 10 May 1998) was a Litvak classical violin prodigy and a virtuoso performer of the theremin, an electronic musical instrument. She was the sister of pianist Nadia Reisenberg.

== Life and career ==
=== Early years ===
Clara Rockmore was born on 9 March 1911 in Vilnius, then in the Russian Empire, to a family of Lithuanian Jews. She had two elder sisters, Anna and Nadia. Early in her childhood she emerged as a violin prodigy. At the age of four, she became the youngest ever student at the Saint Petersburg Conservatory, where she studied under the prominent violinist Leopold Auer. After the October Revolution the family moved back to Vilnius, and then to Warsaw, before obtaining visas and leaving for the United States in 1921.

In America, Rockmore enrolled at the Curtis Institute of Music. As a teenager, tendinitis affected her bow arm, attributed to childhood malnutrition, and resulted in her giving up the violin. However, after meeting fellow immigrant Léon Theremin and being introduced to his electronic instrument, the theremin, she became its most prominent player. She performed widely and helped Theremin to refine his instrument.

=== Career ===
Rockmore made orchestral appearances in New York and Philadelphia and went on coast-to-coast tours with Paul Robeson, but it was not until 1977 that she released a commercial recording called The Art of the Theremin. The album, which was produced by Bob Moog and Shirleigh Moog, featured Rockmore's theremin playing with piano accompaniment by her sister Nadia. Rockmore's approach to theremin playing emphasized physical and emotional control.

As she described it herself in an interview: "You must not only hit a note, but you must hit the center of it. You cannot register any of your internal emotion at all. You cannot shake your head, for instance, or sway back and forth on your feet. That would change your tone."

== Personal life and death ==
Although Léon Theremin had proposed to her once, she married attorney Robert Rockmore, and thereafter used his name professionally. They had no children.

She died in New York City on May 10, 1998, aged 87. Although her health had been in rapid decline for almost a year, she declared her determination to live to see the birth of her great-grandniece, who was born just two days before her death.

== Contributions to the theremin ==
Rockmore's classical training gave her an advantage over the many other theremin performers of the time. The intonation control she acquired as a violinist and her innate absolute pitch were both helpful in playing the instrument.

She had extremely precise, rapid control of her movements, important in playing an instrument that depends on the performer's motion and proximity rather than touch. She developed a unique technique for playing the instrument, including a fingering system that allowed her to perform accurately fast passages and large note leaps without the more familiar portamento, or glide, on theremin.

She also discovered that she could achieve a steadier tone and control the vibrato by keeping the tips of her right-hand thumb and forefinger in contact.

=== Developmental influence ===
Rockmore saw limitations of the original instrument and helped to develop the theremin to fulfill her needs. Working together with Léon Theremin, her suggestions and changes included increasing the sensitivity of the theremin's volume control to facilitate rapid staccato, lowering the profile of the instrument so the performer is more visible, increasing the sensitivity of the pitch antenna, and increasing range from three octaves to five.

=== Public influence ===
By the time Rockmore was playing large scale public concerts, such as New York City's Town Hall in 1938, she was becoming increasingly known for impressing critics with her artistry of the theremin during a time in which much of the general public had come to rather negative conclusions of what was possible on the instrument.

These performances with world class orchestras were also critical in establishing “electronic and experimental music as a viable art form in the public imagination.”

Clara owned an RCA theremin given to her and substantially modified by Theremin. Through his modifications, the instrument's normal 5 to 5.5 octave playable range was expanded by 1.5 octaves. Theremin made several other customizations including improvements to tonal quality and its responsiveness to hand movements. The tubes are also customized and labeled in Theremin's own writing.

This instrument was later restored by Robert Moog in October 1998; it can be viewed at the Clara Rockmore exhibit in the Artist's Gallery of the Musical Instruments Museum in Phoenix, Arizona and is on long-term loan to the museum by Peter Sherman of the Reisenberg family.

== Albums ==
- The Art of the Theremin (1977)
- Clara Rockmore's Lost Theremin Album (2006; recorded 1975)
- Music in and on the air. (2011) Romeo Records.
- Music and Memories: Clara Rockmore (2020) Romeo Records.
- Music and Memories: Clara Rockmore (Bonus Album) (2020) Romeo Records.

== Film and video ==
- Martin, Steven M. (Director) (1995). Theremin: An Electronic Odyssey (Film and DVD). MGM.
- Moog, Robert (Producer) (1998). Clara Rockmore: The Greatest Theremin Virtuosa (Videotape (VHS)). Moog Music and Little Big Films. Archived from the original on 22 December 2008.
- Moog, Robert (Producer) (2005). Two Theremin Classics (DVD). Moog Music and Little Big Films.

== In popular culture ==
- The Irish electropop band The Garland Cult included the song "Clara Rockmore" on their 2007 album Protect Yourself from Hollywood.
- Sean Michaels' novel Us Conductors, the winner of the 2014 Scotiabank Giller Prize, is a fictionalized account of the relationship between Rockmore and Léon Theremin.
- Rockmore was the subject of a Google Doodle on March 9, 2016, which would have been her 105th birthday.
- In Bill & Ted Face the Music, Bill's daughter Thea compliments Ted's theremin playing at Missy's wedding, saying that it rivaled Clara Rockmore. Ted admits she was an inspiration for him.

== See also ==
- Electronic musical instrument
- Léon Theremin
- Synthesizer
