= Lapland Chamber Orchestra =

- Chamber orchestra
- Native name: Lapin kamariorkesteri
- Founded: 1972
- Music director: John Storgårds

The Lapland Chamber Orchestra is the northernmost professional chamber orchestra of Finland and the EU.

The orchestra operates in Rovaniemi, but regularly performs throughout Lapland and internationally. The orchestra's home hall is culture house Korundi, established in May 2011. John Storgårds has been the conductor and artistic director of the 19-member orchestra since 1996. In August 2014, the orchestra performed at the BBC proms festival as the first chamber orchestra in Finland. The orchestra's recording Schnee was nominated for the Gramophone Classical Music Awards in 2022.
