= Régis Campo =

French composer (born 1968)

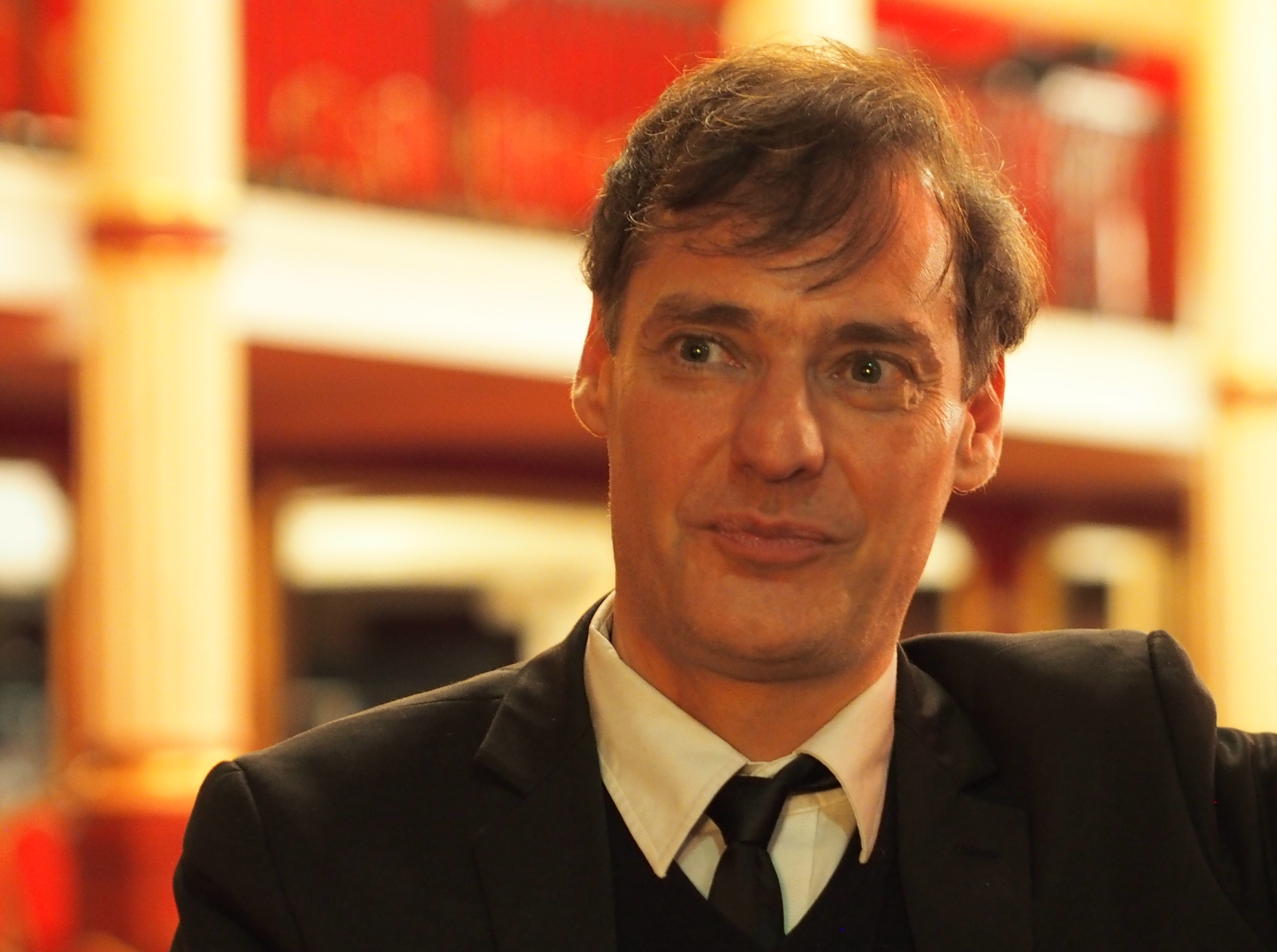
Régis Campo, salle Wagram (Paris, November 2019).

Régis Campo (born 6 July 1968) is a French composer.

== Biography ==
He studied composition with Georges Boeuf at the Conservatory of Marseille. Then he entered the Conservatoire de Paris in the classes of Alain Bancquart and Gérard Grisey, where he obtained his first composition prize in 1995. In 1992, he studied with Edison Denisov, who considered him "one of the most gifted of his generation." His style, often described as playful and colourful, departs from the great aesthetic trends of the late twentieth century with emphasis on melodic invention and tempos of great vitality.

From 1999 to 2001, he was resident at the Villa Medici. In Europe and around thirty countries around the world, many artists have played his music.

His work has received numerous awards including the Gaudeamus Prize (1996), the Special Award Young Composers (1996), the Dutilleux Prize (1996), SACEM prices Hervé Dujardin (1999) and Pierre Cardin (1999) The Institute of France, the SACEM Prize for Young Composers (2005), the “Georges Bizet” Prize of the Institute of France (2005), Prize of the Simone and Cino Del Duca Foundation (2014).

In 2001, his work Lumen, for orchestra, was created by the Berkeley Symphony Orchestra under the direction of Kent Nagano, California. In April 2003, the same performers became successful with the creation of his First Symphony. In November 2003, Felicity Lott and the Ensemble Orchestral de Paris, conducted by John Nelson, created Happy Birthday at the Théâtre des Champs-Élysées. She also created his Bestiary after Apollinaire with the Orchestre National de France under the direction of Altinoglu in November 2008 in Dijon and Paris. His CD “Pop-Art” received the Academy Charles Cros “coup de cœur” in 2005. His Second Symphony “Moz’art” was created in September 2005 by the Ensemble Orchestral de Paris under the direction of John Nelson at the opening of its 2005–2006 season at the Théâtre des Champs-Elysées. The Orchestre symphonique de Montréal, conducted by Kent Nagano, created in 2008 in Montreal, performed his orchestration of Erik Satie's Sports and divertissements.

His second opera “Quai ouest”, based on the play by Bernard-Marie Koltès, was created in September 2014 at the Strasbourg Opera House during the Festival Musica, then given back during the 2014–2015 season in German language at the National Theatre in Nuremberg (Staatstheater Nürnberg).

His catalog – containing over two hundred works – comprises various instrumental or vocal ensembles as: Commedia (1995) for 19 musicians, the Chamber Concerto for 7 musicians (1996), the Violin Concerto (1997– revised 2001), the Livre de Sonates (1997–1999) for organ, the Piano Concerto (1998–1999), Nova (1999) for 12 mixes voices, mixes choir and ensemble, Faërie (2000–2001) for orchestra, Happy Bird (2001) concerto for flute, 2 horns, percussion and string orchestra, Lumen (2001) for orchestra, Pop-art (2002), Symphony no 1 (2002–2003) for orchestra, Ouverture en forme d’étoiles (2004) for orchestra, String Quartet no 1 “Les Heures maléfiques” (2005), Symphony no 2 “Moz’art” (2005) for orchestra, String Quartet no 3 “Ombra felice” (2007), Lumen 2 (2006–2013), Le Bestiaire after Apollinaire for soprano and orchestra (2007–2008), Les Quatre Jumelles, opera buffa for 4 singers and 9 instruments (2008), String Quartet n°5 ” Fata Morgana” (2012), Quai-ouest, opera (2013–2014). The theremin concerto "Dancefloor With Pulsing" by the French composer Regis Campo was written for Carolina Eyck and premiered with the Brussels Philharmonic in 2018.
