= Leon Theremin =

Russian inventor (1896–1993)

- Лев Термен
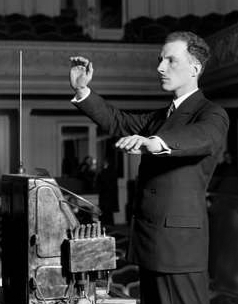
- Lev Termen demonstrating the theremin, December 1927
- Born: Lev Sergeyevich Termen; 28 August 1896; Saint Petersburg, Russia
- Died: 3 November 1993 (aged 97); Moscow, Russia
- Occupations: Engineer; physicist
- Known for: Theremin, The Thing
- Spouses: Katia Konstantinova (m. 1924, divorced) Lavinia Williams (separated) Maria Guschina (m. 1947)
- Children: 2, including Natalia
- Relatives: Peter Theremin (great-grandson)

Lev Sergeyevich Termen (Note: In this name that follows East Slavic naming customs, the patronymic is Sergeyevich and the family name is Termen.) (Note: Russian: Лев Сергеевич Термен, romanized: Lev Sergeyevich Termen, IPA: [ˈlʲef sʲɪrˈɡʲejɪvʲɪtɕ tʲɪrˈmʲen]) (28 August [O.S. 16 August] 1896 – 3 November 1993), better known as Leon Theremin, was a Russian inventor, most famous for his invention of the theremin, one of the first electronic musical instruments and the first to be mass-produced. He also worked on early television research. His secret listening device, "The Thing", hung for seven years in plain view in the United States ambassador's Moscow office and enabled Soviet agents to secretly eavesdrop on conversations.

== Early life ==
Leon Theremin was born in Saint Petersburg, Russia, in 1896. His father was Sergei Emilievich Theremin, of French Huguenot descent. His mother was Yevgenia Antonova Orzhinskaya, who was of German ancestry. He had a sister named Helena.

In the seventh grade of his high school, in front of an audience of students and parents, he demonstrated various optical effects using electricity.

By the age of 17, he was in his last year of high school and had his own laboratory at home for experimenting with high-frequency circuits, optics and magnetic fields. His cousin, Kirill Fedorovich Nesturkh, then a young physicist, invited him to attend the defense of the dissertation of Abram Fedorovich Ioffe. Physics lecturer Vladimir Konstantinovich Lebedinskiy had explained to Theremin the dispute over Ioffe's work on the electron. On 9 May 1913, Theremin and his cousin attended Ioffe's dissertation defense. Ioffe's subject was on the elementary photoelectric effect, the magnetic field of cathode rays and related investigations. In 1917, Theremin wrote that Ioffe talked of electrons, the photoelectric effect and magnetic fields as parts of an objective reality that surrounds us every day, unlike others that talked more of somewhat abstract formulae and symbols. Theremin wrote that he found this explanation revelatory and that it fit a scientific – not abstract – view of the world, different scales of magnitude, and matter. From then on, Theremin endeavoured to study the microcosm, in the same way he had studied the macrocosm with his hand-built telescope. Later, Kirill introduced Theremin to Ioffe as a young experimenter and physicist, and future student of the university.

Theremin recalled that while still in his last year of school, he had built a million-volt Tesla coil and noticed a strong glow associated with his attempts to ionize the air. He then wished to further investigate the effects using university resources. A chance meeting with Abram Fedorovich Ioffe led to a recommendation to see Karl Karlovich Baumgart, who was in charge of the physics laboratory equipment. Karl then reserved a room and equipment for Theremin's experiments. Abram Fedorovich suggested Theremin also look at methods of creating gas fluorescence under different conditions and of examining the resulting light's spectrum. However, during these investigations Theremin was called up for military service as a result of World War I.

== World War I and Russian Civil War ==
Although only in his second academic year, the deanery of the Faculty of Physics and Astronomy recommended that Theremin go to the Nikolayevska Military Engineering School in Petrograd (previously Saint Petersburg), which usually only accepted students in their fourth year. Theremin recalled that Ioffe reassured him that the war would not last long and that military experience would be useful for scientific applications.

Beginning his military service in 1916, Theremin finished the Military Engineering School in six months, progressed through the Graduate Electronic School for Officers, and attained the military radio-engineer diploma in the same year. In the course of the next three and a half years he oversaw the construction of a radio station in Saratov to connect the Volga area with Moscow, graduated from Petrograd University, became deputy leader of the new Military Radiotechnical Laboratory in Moscow, and finished as the broadcast supervisor of the radio transmitter at Tsarskoye Selo near Petrograd (then renamed Detskoye Selo).

During the Russian Civil War, in October 1919 White Army commander Nikolai Nikolayevich Yudenich advanced on Petrograd from the side of Detskoye Selo, apparently intending to capture the radio station to announce a victory over the Bolsheviks. Theremin and others evacuated the station, sending equipment east on rail cars. Theremin then detonated explosives to destroy the 120-meter-high antenna mast before traveling to Petrograd to set up an international listening station. There he also trained radio specialists but reported difficulties obtaining food and working with foreign experts whom he described as narrow-minded pessimists.

Theremin recalled that on an evening when his hopes of overcoming these obstructing experts reached a low ebb, Abram Fedorovich Ioffe telephoned him. Ioffe asked Theremin to come to his newly founded Physical Technical Institute in Petrograd, and the next day he invited him to start work at developing measuring methods for high-frequency electrical oscillations.

== Under Ioffe ==
The day after Ioffe's invitation, Theremin started at the institute. He worked in diverse fields: applying the Laue effect to the new field of X-ray analysis of crystals, using hypnosis to improve measurement-reading accuracy, working with Ivan Pavlov's laboratory, and using gas-filled lamps as measuring devices. He built a high-frequency oscillator to measure the dielectric constant of gases with high precision; Ioffe then urged him to look for other applications using this method, and shortly made the first motion detector for use as a "radio watchman". (Note: Theremin recalled he made the dielectric device first followed by the radio alarm, although Glinsky (p. 23) writes Theremin made the alarm first and then the dielectric device.)

While adapting the dielectric device by adding circuitry to generate an audio tone, Theremin noticed that the pitch changed when his hand moved around. In October 1920 he first demonstrated this to Ioffe who called in other professors and students to hear. Theremin recalled trying to find the notes for tunes he remembered from when he played the cello, such as The Swan, by Saint-Saëns. By November 1920, Theremin had given his first public concert with the instrument, now modified with a horizontal volume antenna replacing the earlier foot-operated volume control. He named it the etherphone, but it was known in the Soviet Union as the Russian: Терменвокс, romanized: Termenvox or Termenvoks, in Germany as the Thereminvox and later, in the USA, as the theremin.

On 24 May 1924 Theremin married 20-year-old Katia (Yekaterina Pavlovna) Konstantinova, and they lived together in his parents' apartment on Marat street. In 1925 Theremin went to Germany to sell both the radio watchman and Termenvox patents to the German firm Goldberg and Sons. According to Glinsky, this was the Soviet's "decoy for capitalists" to obtain both Western profits from sales and technical knowledge.

During that time Theremin was also working on a wireless television with 16 scan lines in 1925, improving to 32 scan lines and then 64 using interlacing in 1926, and he demonstrated moving, if blurry, images on 7 June 1927. His device was the first functioning television apparatus in Russia.

== United States ==
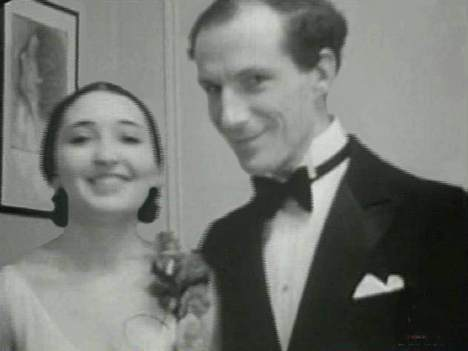
Clara Rockmore on her 18th birthday and Leon Theremin, 1929

After being sent on a lengthy tour of Europe starting 1927–including London, Paris, and towns in Germany – during which he demonstrated his invention to full audiences, Theremin went to the United States arriving on 30 December 1927 with his first wife Katia. He performed the theremin with the New York Philharmonic in 1928. He patented his invention in the United States in 1928 and then granted commercial production rights to RCA.

Theremin set up a laboratory in New York in the 1930s, where he further refined the theremin and experimented with other inventions and new electronic musical instruments. These included the Rhythmicon commissioned by the composer Henry Cowell.

In 1930, ten thereminists performed on stage at Carnegie Hall. Two years later, Theremin conducted the first-ever electronic orchestra, featuring the theremin and other electronic instruments including a "fingerboard" theremin which resembled a cello in use (Theremin was a cellist). In 1931, he worked with composer Henry Cowell to build an instrument called the rhythmicon. They were lucky to have gotten it to market as quickly as they did as brothers Otto and Benjamin Miessner had almost completed a similar instrument with the same name.

Theremin's mentors during this time were some of society's foremost scientists, composers, and musical theorists including composer Joseph Schillinger and physicist (and amateur violinist) Albert Einstein. At the time, Theremin worked closely with fellow Soviet émigré and theremin virtuoso Clara Rockmore (née Reisenberg). Theremin had several times proposed to her, but she chose to marry attorney Robert Rockmore, and thereafter used his name professionally.

The U.S. Federal Bureau of Prisons hired Theremin to build a metal detector for Alcatraz Federal Penitentiary. He was interested in a role for the theremin in dance music. He developed performance locations that could automatically react to dancers' movements with varied patterns of sound and light.

The Soviet consulate had apparently demanded he divorce Katia. Afterwards, while working with the American Negro Ballet Company, the inventor married a young African-American prima ballerina Lavinia Williams. Their marriage caused shock and disapproval in his social circles, but the ostracized couple remained together.

== Return to the Soviet Union ==
Theremin abruptly returned to the Soviet Union in 1938. At the time, the reasons for his return were unclear; some claimed that he was homesick, while others believed that he had been kidnapped by Soviet officials. Beryl Campbell, one of Theremin's dancers, said his wife Lavinia "called to say that he had been kidnapped from his studio" and that "some Russians had come in" and that she felt that he was going to be spirited out of the country.

Many years later, it was revealed that Theremin had returned to his native land due to tax and financial difficulties in the United States. However, Theremin himself once told Bulat Galeyev that he decided to leave himself because he was anxious about the approaching war. Shortly after he returned he was imprisoned in the Butyrka prison and later sent to work in the Kolyma gold mines. Although rumors of his execution were widely circulated and published, Theremin was put to work in a sharashka (a secret laboratory in the Gulag camp system), together with Andrei Tupolev, Sergei Korolev and other well-known scientists and engineers. The Soviet Union said he was rehabilitated, closing its case against him in 1956.

== Espionage ==
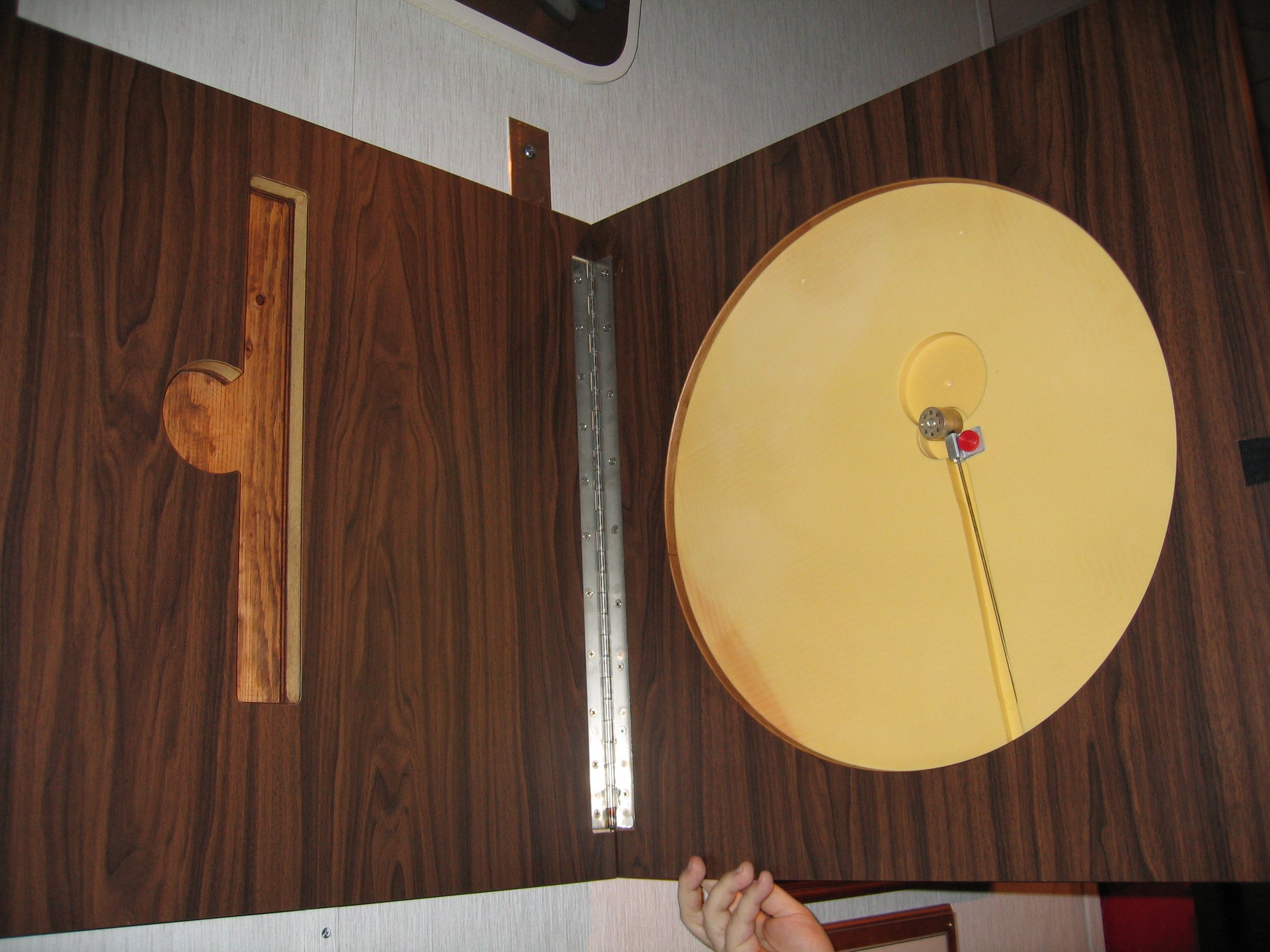
"The Thing"

During his work at the sharashka, where he was put in charge of other workers, Theremin created the Buran eavesdropping system. A precursor to the modern laser microphone, it worked by using a low-power infrared beam from a distance to detect sound vibrations in glass windows. Lavrentiy Beria used the Buran system to spy on the British, French and US embassies in Moscow. According to Galeyev, Beria also spied on Stalin; Theremin kept some of the tapes in his flat. In 1947, Theremin was awarded the Stalin prize for inventing this advance in Soviet espionage technology.

Theremin invented another listening device called The Thing, hidden in a replica of the Great Seal of the United States carved in wood. In 1945, Soviet school children presented the concealed bug to the U.S. Ambassador as a "gesture of friendship" to the USSR's World War II ally. It hung in the ambassador’s residential office in Moscow and intercepted confidential conversations there during the first seven years of the Cold War, until it was accidentally discovered in 1952.

== Later life ==
After his release from the sharashka in 1947, Theremin remained working with the KGB until 1966. By 1947 he had remarried, to Maria Guschina, his third wife, and they had two children: Elena and Natalia.

Theremin worked at the Moscow Conservatory of Music for 10 years where he taught, and built theremins, electronic cellos and some terpsitones (another invention of Theremin). There he was discovered by Harold Schonberg, the chief music critic of The New York Times, who was visiting the Conservatory. But when an article by Schonberg appeared mentioning Theremin, the Conservatory's Managing Director declared that "electricity is not good for music; electricity is to be used for electrocution" and had his instruments removed from the Conservatory. Further electronic music projects were banned, and Theremin was summarily dismissed.

In the 1970s, Leon Theremin was a Professor of Physics at Moscow State University (Department of Acoustics) developing his inventions and supervising graduate students.

After 51 years in the Soviet Union, Theremin started traveling, first visiting France in June 1989 and then the United States in 1991, each time accompanied by his daughter Natalia, who is a professional thereminist. The visit to the United States was made possible by an invitation from Stanford University. In honor of the university's 100th anniversary, Leon Theremin performed at the university's Grand Stadium, and his Natalia Theremin played Rachmaninoff's "Vocalise" on her father's theremin, accompanied by electronic music pioneer Max Matthews. He also made a demonstration concert at the Royal Conservatory of The Hague in early 1993 before dying in Moscow on Wednesday 3 November 1993 at the age of 97.

His descendants, daughter Natalia Theremin and great-grandson Peter Theremin, are professional theremin performers and promote the legacy of Leon Theremin.

== Media ==
The feature-length documentary film Theremin: An Electronic Odyssey was released in 1993. Theremin's life story and his Great Seal bug invention were featured in a 2012 episode of the Dark Matters: Twisted But True.

In 2000, University of Illinois Press published Theremin: Ether Music and Espionage by Albert Glinsky, with a foreword by Robert Moog. In 2014, Canadian writer Sean Michaels published the novel Us Conductors, which was inspired by the relationship between Leon Theremin and Clara Rockmore. The novel won the 2014 Scotiabank Giller Prize. In 2022, French writer Emmanuel Villin published the novel La Fugue Thérémine (éditions Asphalte), which looks back on the life of Leon Theremin.

== Inventions ==
- Theremin (1920)
- Burglar alarm, or "Signalling Apparatus" which used the Theremin effect (1920s)
- Electromechanical television – Nipkow disk with mirrors instead of slots (ca. 1925)
- Terpsitone – platform which converts dance movements into tones (1932)
- Theremin cello – an electronic cello with no strings and no bow, using a plastic fingerboard, a handle for volume and two knobs for sound shaping (ca. 1930)
- Keyboard theremin (ca. 1930), a small keyboard "with hornlike tones"
- Rhythmicon – world's first drum machine (1931)
- The Buran eavesdropping device (1947 or earlier)
- The Great Seal bug, also known as "The Thing" – one of the first passive covert listening devices; first used by the USSR for spying (1945 or earlier); it is considered a predecessor of RFID technology

== See also ==
- Spharophon, a Theremin-like instrument made by Jörg Mager around 1921
- Lee de Forest, inventor of the amplifying vacuum tube
- The Trautonium, an early electronic instrument contemporary with the theremin invented by Friedrich Trautwein and later developed by Oskar Sala
- Maurice Martenot, inventor of the Ondes Martenot, a keyboard-based instrument using the heterodyning method
- Robert Moog
- Raymond Scott

== Sources ==
- Galeyev, Bulat M.; Translated by Vladimir Chudnovsky (1996). "Light and Shadows of a Great Life: In Commemoration of the One-Hundredth Anniversary of the Birth of Leon Theremin, Pioneer of Electronic Art". Leonardo Music Journal. 6. Linked from LMJ 6
- Lobanova, Marina (1999). "Lew Termen: Erfinder, Tschekist, Spion". Neue Zeitschrift für Musik (in German). 4: 50–53.
- Glinsky, Albert (2000). Theremin: Ether Music and Espionage. Urbana, Illinois: University of Illinois Press. ISBN 0-252-02582-2.
- Mattis, Olivia (1989-06-16). "An Interview with Leon Theremin / Olivia Mattis and Leon Theremin in Bourges, France". Translated by Nina Boguslawsky; Alejandro Tkaczevski. copied here Theremin Vox - An Interview with Leon Theremin
- Termen, Lew. "Erinnerungen an A.F. Joffe" (in German). Website of the Institute of Media Archeology, Austria. Archived from the original on 2009-05-11. Sections translated by Felix Eder from the Russian originals in: Жузе, В. П., ed. (1973). Воспоминания об А. Ф. Иоффе [Memories of A.F. Joffe]. Nauka (Leningrad).
- Wright, Peter (1987). Spycatcher: The Candid Autobiography of a Senior Intelligence Officer. New York: Viking. ISBN 0-670-82055-5.
