= Péter Kőszeghy =

Hungarian composer

- Born: September 2, 1971 (age 54); Balassagyarmat, Hungary
- Occupation: Composer
- Instrument: Flute

Péter Kőszeghy (born 2 September 1971) is a Hungarian composer and music educator.

== Life ==
Kőszeghy was born in 1971 in Balassagyarmat, Hungary. From 1985 to 1989 he attended the Béla-Bartók High School of Music in Miskolc, where he received flute lessons. From 1989 to 1992 he studied flute and music pedagogy at the Pedagogical Faculty of the Franz Liszt Academy of Music in Győr. He also took private composition lessons with Attila Reményi and Endre Olsvay. From 1992 to 1993 he was a member of the "Group of Young Composers" (Fiatal Zeneszerzők Csoportja (F.Z.CS.)) in Budapest.

In 1993 he moved to Germany and studied musical composition with Paul-Heinz Dittrich and electronic music with Andre Bartetzki at the Studio für Elektroakustische Musik (Berlin) (STEAM) of the Hochschule für Musik "Hanns Eisler" until 1999. From 2000 to 2001 he attended the composition class of Hans Zender at the Hochschule für Musik und Darstellende Kunst Frankfurt. He attended seminars by Edisson Denissow, Gerhard Stäbler, Mathias Spahlinger and Friedrich Goldmann. He was also a guest at the Darmstädter Ferienkurse.

Since 1999 he has lived in Berlin as a freelance composer and music teacher. His works have been performed by the Helsinki Philharmonic Orchestra, the Ensemble Musikfabrik, the Kammerensemble Neue Musik Berlin, the Ensemble Sortisatio, the Ensemble Zagros and the Ensemble Aleph, among others. Since 2004 his complete works have been published by Edition Juliane Klein. In 2009 he was Composer in Residence of Deutschlandfunk and the St. Peter's Church, Cologne.

In 2002 he was a lecturer at the promotion course "Jugend komponiert" (Young Composers) at the Rheinsberg Music Academy, in 2008 at the Weimarer Frühjahrstage für zeitgenössische Musik and since 2009 at the KlangNetz Dresden and the Hochschule für Musik Carl Maria von Weber in Dresden.

Kőszeghy is a member of the Brandenburgischer Verein Neue Musik, since 2007 of musik21 and since 2009 of the Forum Zeitgenössischer Musik Leipzig.

== Work ==
=== Soli ===
- L'École du Libertinage for E-violin [2002]
- SPIRITS for Flute and CD [2004/2005] for Camilla Hoitenga
- NIOBE for Flöte [2008]
- UTOPIE XIII "Eisblüten" for piccolo flute [2007] dedicated to Camilla Hoitenga
- UTOPIE XV "crystal" for organ [2009], commissioned by the DLF
- UTOPIE XVII "chochma" for planks Pierce clarinet [2009/2010]
- UTOPIA XI "deep inside" for tuba - dedicated to Jan Termath [2011]
- CHUFU for contraforts - dedicated to Robert Gillinger [2011]
- ATEM for double bass flute - dedicated to Klaus Schöpp [2011]
- BLUE (brooklet) for piano [2012]
- SUN for toy piano [2012]
- NOIRE (noble - brilliant) for piano [2012-13]
- MOON VEIL for toy piano and melodica (one player) [2013]

=== Chamber music ===
- "GEGEBEN SEI: 1st, fat that hides, 2nd, felt that warms, 3rd, copper that conducts, 4th, honey that nourishes, 5th, blood that pulsates, 6th, battery that charges" for clarinet (B♭), bassoon, trombone, percussion, piano, violoncello and double bass [2005]
- IGNIS, LUX... for clarinet(s), saxophone(s) and piano [2004/2005]
- Es ist GENUG! for 3 recorders [2005]
- UTOPIA (sound instead of Still City - stray illusion) piano trio [2005]
- POGO for four percussionists with fur instruments [2006]
- SECRET BOOK for soprano, flute, oboe, clarinet in B♭, piano and percussion [2006]
- ABYSS [2006] for voice and accordion. premiere 26 January 2007 Bamberg (New Palace; Irene Kurka) [soprano], Stefan Hippe [accordion])
- GARM for four percussionists with metal instruments [2007]
- LOUHI for flute, oboe, clarinet (B♭), bassoon, horn (F) and double bass [2007]
- MORTUALIUM (coins for Charon) "In memoriam György Ligeti" for flute, oboe, clarinet (B♭), bass clarinet, horn, trombone, celesta, piano, 2 violins, viola, V.cello, double bass [2007]
- [SCHOCK] KOMA for electric guitar, percussion [2008]
- STIGMA (urban game) for flute, clarinet, harp, percussion, piano [2009]
- KOLLAPS for contraforts, ensemble (flute, oboe, 2 clarinets, trombone, piano, 2 violins, viola, violoncello) [2009/10] [2009/10
- STIGMA - dying berlin blues for clarinet, trumpet, electric guitar, electric bass, percussion [2011]
- CONCEALED SOULS for string quartet [2011]
- souls for flute, viola, violoncello [2011]
- STYX for 2 tenor recorders, cello, harpsichord [2011]
- GARGOIL (No. 1) for accordion, percussion [2011]
- FLIGHT OF ICAROS for flute, clarinet, saxophone, percussion, piano, 2 violins, viola, violoncello, double bass [2012]
- HEKATE's DREAM for recorder, violin and cello [2012]
- CHACONNE - zedekhia's tears for flute, clarinet, piano, violin, violoncello [2013]
- AMETHYST for flute, piano [2013]
- saphir for clarinet, piano [2013]
- "death march - In Memoriam Alice Herz-Sommer" for voice, ensemble (Fl., Klar., Hr., Pos., Perc., Klav., Vl., Vla., Vc. Kb.) [2014].

=== Chamber music with electronics ===
- ARIADNE's THREAD (loose - pick up) for flute, oboe, bassoon and CD [2006]
- ROOTS - joint composition with Gerhard Stäbler for 2 voices, flute, violin, violoncello, piano, live-electronics and CDs [2006]
- "SATANS TRICKS (Sebeinket tànyèrodra rakom)" /I lay our wounds on your bowl/ (based on a poem by Lörinc Szabò) for 2 flutes, bassoon, trombone, violin, cello, harp, piano and synthesizer [DX 7] and playback CD [2006]
- DEPHT for bass clarinet (in Bb), tuba, double bass, piano, percussion and CD [2006]
- MATRIX 01.02.03.04. for recorder trio, electronics [2011]
- SEELENGELEITER for 2 trumpets, percussion and electronics [2012]
- jupiter's clouds for two flutes, electronics [2013]

=== Orchestra ===
- STEINFLUT (Handschmeichler und Donnerkeile) for large orchestra (77), [2000].
- SOLUFLIGHT (the edge) Concerto for flute and large orchestra [2006]
- SATURN WAYS Concerto for flute and small Orchestra (Solo flute, fl., ob., cl., 2 perc., strings: 6-4-4-3-1) [2008/2009] [2008/2009
- "...der Pfahl im Fleische..." for String Orchestra (6-6-4-4-2) [2010]
- THREE SHAMANISTIC RITUALS four Pieces for Orchestra (2 fl., 2 ob., 2 cl., 2 bsn., 4 hn., 2 trp., 2 trb., t., 2 perc., hf., strings) [2011] [2011]
- FULL MOON FLOAT for Orchestra (instrumentation ad lib.: 2 fl./ad lib. flfl, ob/ad lib. Blfl, 2 Fg, Pos./ad lib Fg., 2 percussionists, keyboard instruments/ad lib. piano, e-pno, keyb., melodicas/, violins I and II, violas, violoncelli/divisi) [2013]
- HOT STONES - BROKEN DIAMONDS first clarinet concerto for Solo clarinet and orchestra for Csaba Rajnai [2014]

=== Electroacoustics ===
- CROSSOVER for oboe, bassoon, viola, guitar (also electric guitar) and CD [2002/2005]. Premiere: Ensemble Sortisatio, Zwischengrün "Musik und Landschaft", Halde in Grünau, Leipzig 17 September 2005.
- DEPHT for bass clarinet, tuba, double bass, piano, percussion and CD [2006].

=== Stage ===
- CREATURE 3 (The Dictator) chamber opera based on the libretto by Thomas Lehr for tenor, 2 baritones, flute, clarinet, bassoon, horn, trombone, percussion, harp, piano, double bass [2006/2007].

=== Sound actions ===
- ZAUN(Pietà) an audio picture to a photograph by H. Strecker; sound action for jewish harp with distortion and playback CD [2003]
- SEXUS-PLEXUS-NEXUS sound action for male screamers with gain/distortion and playback CD [2003]

== Writings ==
- Grenzüberschreitungen – Wege, Neues zu finden? In KunstMusik 4 (2005) pp. 46–50.
- Warum komponiere ich (nicht) für die Kirche? Eine Umfrage. In Musik & Kirche 79 (2009) 4, pp. 260–264.

== Literature ==
- Martin Tchiba: Losgelöst. Der Komponist Peter Köszeghy. In: Neue Zeitschrift für Musik 175, 2014 (1), pp. 60–63.
- Mathias Lehmann: Kőszeghy, Péter. In Ludwig Finscher (ed.): Musik in Geschichte und Gegenwart (MGG). Supplement, Bärenreiter, Kassel [among others] 2008, pp. 438–439.
- Kőszeghy, Péter. In: Axel Schniederjürgen (ed.): Kürschners Musiker-Handbuch. 5th edition, Saur Verlag, Munich 2006, ISBN 3-598-24212-3, p. 245.
