= Ulrike Liedtke =

German politician and musicologist

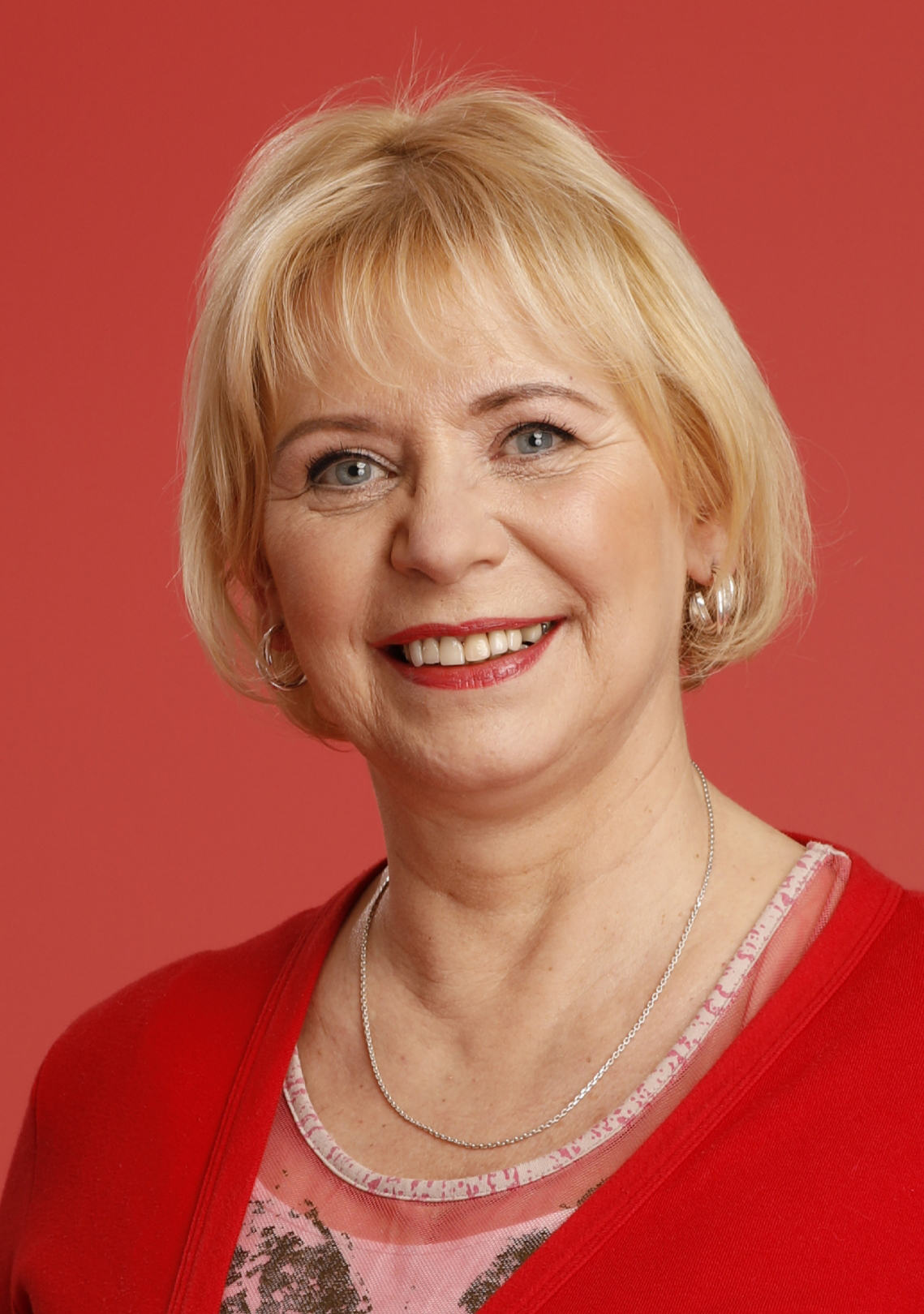
- Ulrike Liedtke in 2019

President of the Landtag of Brandenburg
- Incumbent
- Assumed office 2019

Personal details
- Born: Ulrike Nehrdich; 17 November 1958 (age 67) Weimar, Thuringia, East Germany
- Party: SPD
- Children: 2
- Education: Leipzig University
- Occupation: Musicologist; Academic teacher

Ulrike Liedtke (née Nehrdich; born 17 November 1958) is a German musicologist and politician (SPD). From 1991 to 2014 she was founding director of the Musikakademie Rheinsberg. Since 2014 she has been a member of the Landtag of Brandenburg. After her re-election in 2019 she was elected President of the Landtag.

== Career ==
Liedtke was born in Weimar in 1958, the daughter of a conductor and a musicologist. She attended six schools and studied musicology after her Abitur in Stralsund in 1977 at the Karl-Marx-University Leipzig. During her studies in 1980 she became a member of the Gewandhauschor and the extra choir of the Oper Leipzig. From 1978 to 1985, she worked as a dramaturgical freelancer in the field of booklets and introductions for the Gewandhaus in Leipzig. She also wrote numerous reviews for the Leipzig and Magdeburg regional press. She completed her studies in 1982 with a diploma. In 1985 she was awarded the Promotion A with a thesis Siegfried Matthus – Tendenzen im Schaffen eines Komponisten der DDR (Siegfried Matthus – Tendencies in the Work of a Composer of the GDR).

In 1985 and 1986, Liedtke was music editor for festival and opera broadcasts at the Deutscher Fernsehfunk in Berlin. She was responsible for the concept and editing and presented a series of broadcasts on Neue Musik (21 broadcasts until 1997). In 1986 she moved to the Akademie der Künste der DDR.

After the 1990 election of the city council of East Berlin 1990, she became head of the department for music, theatre, museums and film of the city council. From 1991 to 1993, she worked in the Ministry of Science, Research and Culture of Brandenburg, responsible for Rheinsberg from September 1991.

From 1991 to 2014 she was founding director of the Musikakademie Rheinsberg. From 1993 she was also managing director and artistic director of the Musikakademie Rheinsberg, also running its Schlosstheater from 2000, with music theatre, ballet and concerts. A focus on works from the 18th century and contemporary music also enabled formats such as performance art. In 2001, the academy was named a "Federal and State Academy". The institution was awarded the critics' prize for music of the Association of German Critics in 2004. In 2006, it received a place of honour at the further education award of the state of Brandenburg.

Liedtke lectured about music theatre, including in 1998/99 at the Hochschule für Musik Franz Liszt, Weimar, and the Hochschule für Musik Hanns Eisler in Berlin. In 2017, she was appointed professor of musicology at the University of Potsdam. Her research is focused on music of the 18th century and contemporary music, also opera and opéra comique, Brandenburg regional music history, and critical editing. She wrote contributions to standard works including Komponisten der Gegenwart, The New Grove Dictionary of Music and Musicians and Die Musik in Geschichte und Gegenwart. She has been a member of the Verband deutscher Schriftstellerinnen und Schriftsteller since 1999.

Liedtke is the mother of two children. Her son was a member of the Leipzig Thomanerchor.

== Politics ==
Liedtke was an independent until the fall of the Berlin Wall in 1989. In 1989 she was then co-founder of the Social Democratic Party in the GDR in Berlin-Hohenschönhausen. Since 1990 she has been a member of the Social Democratic Party of Germany and was a member of the board in Berlin-Hohenschönhausen, Zepernick, Rheinsberg. From 2016 to 2019 she was chairman of the SPD Unterbezirk of Ostprignitz-Ruppin. She is also the spokeswoman of the cultural forum of the SPD Brandenburg.

From 1990 to 2002 she was a member, and temporarily head, of the Bezirk von Berlin, Bezirk Hohenschönhausen and Bezirk Lichtenberg, respectively. In May 2019 she became a city councillor in Rheinsberg. She is the leader of the SPD parliamentary group.

In the 2014 Brandenburg state elections she won a direct mandate in the Landtagswahlkreis Ostprignitz-Ruppin I (Constituency 3). She defended her mandate with 23.6 percent of the first votes in the 2019 state elections, and on 25 September 2019 was elected president of the state parliament with 77 of 88 votes at the constituent session.

== Memberships ==
From 1995 to 1997 Liedtke was a member of the National Committee of the UNESCO Cultural Decade. From 1997 until the rotation in 2009 she was a member and (temporarily) chairperson of the Rundfunkrat of the Ostdeutscher Rundfunk Brandenburg and the Rundfunk Berlin-Brandenburg. After having been vice-president of the Landesmusikrat Brandenburg e.V. since 1995, she was elected as its president in 2016. From 2000 to 2002 she was the spokeswoman of the Arbeitskreis der Musikbildungsstätten in Deutschland. In 2000 she became a member of the executive committee, and in 2005 also a member of the supervisory board, of the Deutscher Musikrat. From 2000 to 2005 she was an expert for the Culture 2000 funding programme of the European Commission. From 2000 to 2017 she was an author and chairperson of the advisory board of the CD documentation Musik in Deutschland 1950–2000 of the DMR. From 2001 to 2017 she was an author and member of the editorial board of the music magazine Musikforum. In addition, since 2009 she has been the chairperson of the conference of the state music councils in the Deutscher Musikrat (DMR) and since 2013 vice president and member of the supervisory board of the DMR. Liedtke was a member of the board of trustees of Musikfonds e.V. from 2016 until 2020, for which she did the conceptual groundwork. The German Council of Cultural Advisors elected Liedtke in 2019 as one of two vice presidents of the Deutscher Kulturrat. She is an individual member of the Brandenburgischer Chorverband, as well as chairwoman of Tanz & Art Rheinsberg and the Ferdinand Möhring Gesellschaft.

== Honours ==
- Hans Stieber Prize (1988)
- Order of Merit of the Federal Republic of Germany am Bande (2001)
- Kunstpreis des Landes Brandenburg (main prize) (2001)
- Leo-Wistuba-Medaille of the Brandenburgischer Chorverband (2001)
- Ehrennadel of the Landesmusikrat Brandenburg (2003)
- "Kritikerpreis für Musik 2004" for the Rheinsberg Music Academy of the Association of German Critics
- Place of Honour "Further Education Prize of the State of Brandenburg" for the Rheinsberg Music Academy (2006)
- Integrationspreis of the Landrat Ostprignitz-Ruppin for Tanz & Art Rheinsberg (2016)
- Integrationspreis of the Bundespräsident for the Rheinsberg model (2017)

== Publications ==
Liedtke wrote composers biographies for encyclopedias, including those of Gerd Domhardt, Siegfried Matthus, Günter Neubert and Karl Ottomar Treibmann:

- With Gert Belkius (ed.): Musik für die Oper? Mit Komponisten im Gespräch. Henschel-Verlag, Berlin 1990, ISBN 3-362-00479-2.
- With Helge Bartholomäus (ed.): Festschrift 10 Jahre Berliner Fagottquartett, 5 Jahre Meisterkurse der Musikakademie Rheinsberg. Musik- und Buchverlag Feja, Berlin 1996, ISBN 978-3-929355-04-8.
- Matthus, Siegfried, in Komponisten der Gegenwart, edited by Hans-Werner Heister and Wolfgang Sparrer, edition text + kritik, München 1996
- (Ed.): Jeder nach seiner Fasson. Musikalische Neuansätze heute. Eine Veröffentlichung der Musikakademie Rheinsberg. Pfau, Saarbrücken 1997, ISBN 978-3-930735-70-9.
- Landesmusikplan Brandenburg. Landesmusikrat Brandenburg, Senftenberg 1997/2000.
- Domhardt, Gerd, Siegfried, in Komponisten der Gegenwart, edited by Hans-Werner Heister and Wolfgang Sparrer, edition text + kritik, Munich 1996
- Karl Ottomar Treibmann, in Komponisten der Gegenwart, ed. by Hans-Werner Heister and Wolfgang Sparrer, edition text + kritik, Munich 1998
- Treibmann, Karl Ottomar, in The New Grove Dictionary of Music and Musicians, 1998
- Domhardt, Gerd, in The New Grove Dictionary of Music and Musicians, 1998
- With Claudia Schurz (ed.): Das Theater des Prinzen Heinrich. Ein Lesebuch zum Schloßtheater Rheinsberg. Hofmeister, Leipzig 2000, ISBN 978-3-87350-016-7.
- Günter Neubert, in Komponisten der Gegenwart, ed. by Hans-Werner Heister and Wolfgang Sparrer, edition text + kritik, München 2003
- Thomas Heyn, in Komponisten der Gegenwart, ed. by Hans-Werner Heister and Wolfgang Sparrer, edition text + kritik, Munich 2004
- Karl Ottomar Treibmann: Klangwanderungen. Kamprad, Altenburg 2004, ISBN 978-3-930550-32-6.
- (ed.): Die Rheinsberger Hofkapelle von Friedrich II. Musiker auf dem Weg zum Berliner „Capell-Bedienten“. Veröffentlichung der Musikakademie Rheinsberg GmbH. 2nd revised edition, Hofmeister, Leipzig, 2005, ISBN 978-3-87350-019-8.
- (ed.): Frau Musica heute. Konzepte für Kompositionen. Veröffentlichung der Musikakademie Rheinsberg gGmbh. Hofmeister, Leipzig 2005, ISBN 978-3-87350-031-0.
- Contributions to Lothar Voigtländer, Wilhelm Weismann, Walter Zimmermann: Die Musik in Geschichte und Gegenwart (MGG), Bärenreiter, Kassel 2007
- Contributions to Romely Pfund, Annette Schlünz, Juliane Klein, Genderhandbuch, ed. by Annette Kreutziger-Herr and Melanie Unseld, Bärenreiter Kassel, 2010, ISBN 978-3-7618-2043-8.
- Ich bin Komponist. Friedrich II. als Musiker. Ries & Erler, Berlin 2012, ISBN 978-3-87676-019-3.
- Leidenschaftliche Bekenntnisse, Erlebnisse mit Musik von Lothar Voigtländer, in: Ein Prisma Ostdeutscher Musik, ed. by Albrecht von Massow, Thomas Grysko and Josephine Orkno, Böhlau-Verlag Cologne, Weimar, Vienna, 2015, pp. 101–109, ISBN 978-3-412-22518-6.
- hören: multisensorial, in Internationales Klangkunstfest Berlin 2014, Jubiläumsausgabe with DVD 2004–2014, ed. by Thomas Gerwin, Berlin 2015, ISBN 978-3-00-048620-3.
- Musik von Anfang an, in Wolfgang Kurth: Musikerziehung. Lehrbuch für Staatlich anerkannte Erzieher, Facherzieher für Musik und andere Sozialpädagogische Berufe in Ausbildung und Studium, Westermann Braunschweig 2019, p. 8. ISBN 978-3-14-239564-7
- Rheinsberg ist schön, Das Auf und Ab und neue Aufmerksamkeit für den ländlichen Raum, in Ein schöner Land, Loccumer Protokolle 13/2018, ed. by Albert Drews, Rehburg-Loccum 2019, pp. 49–56. ISBN 978-3-8172-1318-4.
