= Thomas Christoph Heyde =

German composer, media artist and curator (born 1973)

Thomas Christoph Heyde (born 12 November 1973) is a German composer, media artist and curator. He is chairman of the Forum Zeitgenössischer Musik Leipzig.

== Life ==
Heyde was born in Leipzig in 1973 as the son of a pastor. From the age of seven he was trained on the piano and later received private composition lessons from Lorenz Stolzenbach. Without passing his Abitur he first completed a pharmaceutical education and worked as a nurse in a Leipzig hospital. Via a special test he studied musical composition with Peter Herrmann and electroacoustic music with Eckhard Rödger at the University of Music and Theatre Leipzig from 1994 on. Thanks to two scholarships he studied from 1997 to 1999 as Meisterschüler for composition with Friedrich Schenker at the Academy of Arts, Berlin and with Thomas Kesseler at the Elektronisches Studio Basel of the City of Basel Music Academy.

From 1998 to 2006 he taught the new media art at the Hochschule für Grafik und Buchkunst Leipzig and was head of the electronic studio there. From 2001 to 2002 he was organizer of the concert series Sende(r)musik of the Mitteldeutscher Rundfunk. (MDR). He was curator of several projects, including Interferences of Beck & Eggeling International Fine Art, Düsseldorf (1998), the Spinnerei-Festival for contemporary music, Leipzig/Dresden (1999–2001), the Musik-Zeit-Herbstfestival, Leipzig (2001), the Matrix-Herbstfestival for sound art, Leipzig (2003), the Grenzregionen-Festival for Eastern European music, Leipzig (2004), the project ost. etc, Leipzig (2003) and the art festival electric renaissance, Halle (2005). Since 2003 he is artistic director of the Forum Zeitgenössischer Musik Leipzig (FZML). He organized among others the international art and music project Cage100 (2012/13) and the transmediale project ABENDMAHL – "diminishing horror | increasing love". In the winter semester 2012/13 he was a lecturer on John Cage and in 2016/17 on musical concepts after 1945 at the Institute of Musicology of the University of Leipzig.

He writes mainly orchestral and chamber music. His compositions have been broadcast by Deutschlandradio, Deutschlandfunk, MDR, Bayerischer Rundfunk, Westdeutscher Rundfunk and Swiss Radio. His special interests are live electronics and video art. Thus he worked together with Ulrich Polster. The resulting art videos have been shown in museums in France and Great Britain.

With the professor of linguistics Tatjana Zybatow (University of Flensburg) he has two children. He is married to the psychologist and therapist Ina Habt.

Heyde is chairman of the board of Mosaik Leipzig e.V. The institution operates a migration consultancy service among others and a psychosocial centre for refugees.

== Sound language ==
The music journalist Dirk Wieschollek described Heyde as: "equally socialized with 'classical music', 'new music' and 'techno'". In the radio feuilleton of Deutschlandfunk Kultur it was said: "He wants to inspire people for New Music who have little contact with high culture. Therefore he also has concerts played in very unusual places."

== Awards ==
- Scholarships of: Academy of Arts Berlin, German National Academic Foundation, Alfried Krupp von Bohlen und Halbach Foundation, Cultural Foundation of the Free State of Saxony
- 2001: Handel Prize of the City of Halle (shared price for composition)

== Works ==
=== Without electronics ===
- Apparitionen I (1995/96) for trumpet solo
- Streichquartett Nr. 3 (1995) – 1. Version (1996/97) – 2. Version
- Charakteristische Studien für Klavier (1995/96)
- Drei „Lieder“ (1995/96) for baritone and piano
- Streichquartett Nr. 4 (1995/96)
- Rhythmica Moblié (1995) for four pianists at two pianos
- Appartments II (1995). Chamber music for 9 players
- Lamento ? (1996). Requiem for 3 instruments, 2 speakers and voice. Premiere Weimar 1997
- NO NAME (1997). A potpourri of awakening for ensemble. Premiere Berlin 1997
- mein fremdes Land (1998) for flute solo
- ENSEMBLE (1998) for prepared piano. Premiere Leipzig 1998
- vor mir entlang (1998) for four recorder players
- Apparitions V (1999) for solo violin
- Schwebung (1999) for two-manual harpsichord
- für S. (1999). Arie für Bariton und Kammerensemble (after a text by Jürgen Becker). Premiere Leipzig 1999
- rufen? nein, wollen! (1999) for Ensemble
- Ansichtennetz (2000) for English horn, bassoon, guitar and viola. First performance Leipzig 2001 (Music-Time-Autumn Festival, Schaubühne Lindenfels, Ensemble Sortisatio)
- Schwarzfahrer-Marsch I/II (2007) for accordion, triolas and percussion
- Bälle und Felle (2008) for accordion and 3 percussionists

=== With electronics ===
- Apparitionen III (1995/96) for solo violin, 4-channel playback tapes and live electronics. UA Leipzig 1996
- KULTUS (1996/97) for mezzo-soprano, chamber orchestra, chamber choir, live electronics and tape (with texts). First performance Leipzig 2000
- Appartments IV (1997/98). Audio pictures for oboe, 4-channel tape and live electronics (based on texts by Anna Akhmatova and Jurij Brězan). First performance Leipzig 1998
- ARENA (1998) for orchestra
- Umgang-Aufstieg-Abgang (1999) for flute, oboe, trumpet, percussion, live electronics and 4-channel tape
- Gewässer des Lichts (2000) for mezzo-soprano, small ensemble and tape (after a text by Johannes Bobrowski)
- Piano(s)-Chat (2000) for MIDI piano, computer and live electronics. first performance Leipzig
- Fernen (2001) for 3 recorders, 8-channel tape and live electronics. first performance Berlin
- Ich-ein Fremder (2001) for voice, chamber orchestra, 7.1 surround tape and live electronics (after texts by Miguel de Unamuno and Thomas Christoph Heyde). Premiere Dresden (Dresden Centre for Contemporary Music, Titus Engel (cond.))
- Confetti Parade mit Hardcore-Romantik (2002) for flute, electric guitar, video and electronics
- Apparitionen VI (2002) for bassoon, 2-channel tape and subwoofer
- Apparitionen VI (2002/05) for recorder, 2-channel tape recorder and subwoofer
- High-Culture-Motherfuckers (2002/03) for 4 percussionists and tape
- 3xkurz 3xlang (2005/06) for ensemble, live-electronics and tape
- 3xkurz 3xlang II (2007/08) for ensemble, live electronics and tape
- CH-GS1978 (2005/06) for 3 recorders, mobile video monitors and tape
- Frost (2004–07) for violoncello, electronics and video screens
- memory-faded (2006/07) for viola, piano and live electronics
- Fieldz (2006/07) for piano, 4 percussionists and electronics
- Death Is Not the End (2008) for organ, viola and electronics

== Writings ==
- Wege – Auswege – Umwege. Zu Situation, Strukturen und Inhalten der zeitgenössischen Musik. In Neue Musikzeitung 51 (2002) 2. (together with Péter Kőszeghy)
- Neue Musik ohne Festivals? In Positionen 52 (2002), pp. 32–35. (along with Claus-Steffen Mahnkopf)
- FreiZeitArbeit. In Positionen 76 (2008), pp. 42–43.
- B-A-C-H | C-A-G-E. Zwei Weltenordner, Leipzig und CAGE100. In Positionen 93 (2012).
