= Barbara Buchholz =

German composer and theremin player

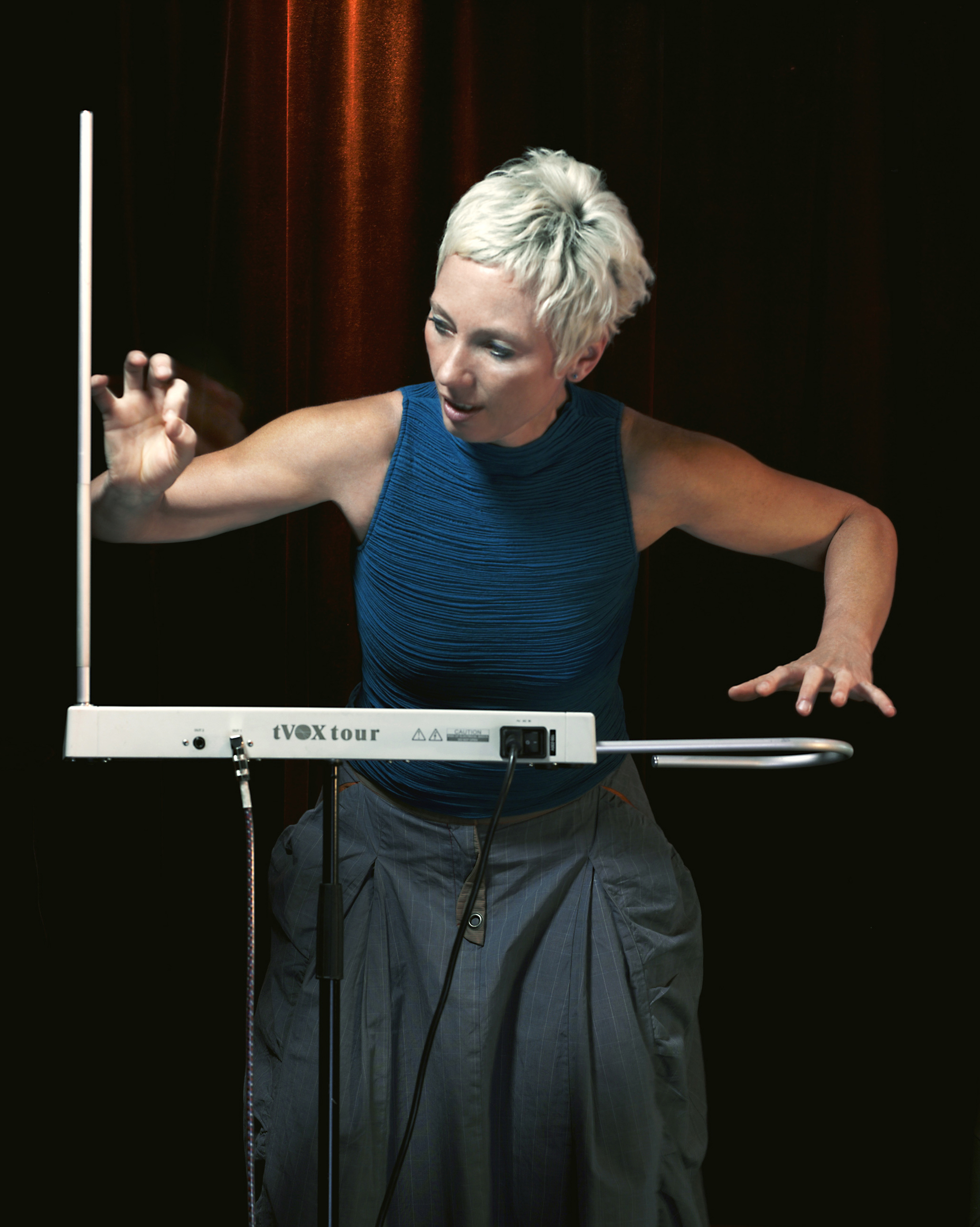
Barbara Buchholz plays a TVox model by G. Pavlov.

Barbara Buchholz (8 December 1959 – 10 April 2012) was a Berlin-based German musician and composer. She was one of the leading theremin players of the world.

== Life ==
Buchholz was born in Duisburg. She studied flute, guitar, bass guitar and singing at the Bielefeld University. She earned her first success as a bass player in the German woman jazz band Reichlich Weiblich. Since the early 1980s she worked on various interdisciplinary projects both as performer and composer. She produced e.g. Tap It Deep - „midified“ Steppdance and music, Human Interactivity and Theremin: Berlin-Moscow.

At the end of the 1990s Buchholz met Lydia Kavina, the grandniece of Léon Theremin; later she went to Moscow and became a master student of Kavina. In jazz and contemporary music she develops new playing techniques and experiments with various sound possibilities for the theremin. Together with Kavina, in 2005 Buchholz founded the Platform Touch! Don't Touch! for theremin. New compositions for the platform were worked out amongst others by Moritz Eggert, Michael Hirsch, Caspar Johannes Walter, Juliane Klein, Peter Gahn, Gordon Kampe and Sidney Corbett. Buchholz performed in a trio with Norwegian trumpeter Arve Henriksen and live electronics performer Jan Bang, toured with Jazz Bigband Graz in the framework of ELECTRIC POETRY & Lo-Fi Cookies and conducted solo performances as well.

She played the theremin in various contemporary works, like The Little Mermaid, a ballet by John Neumeier, music by Lera Auerbach, and in the operas Linkerhand by Moritz Eggert and Bestmann-Opera by Alex Nowitz.

In 2009 Buchholz participated in the talent show - the German version of Got Talent - and succeeded in presenting the theremin to a wide audience.

== Death ==
Barbara Buchholz died on April 10, 2012, in Berlin after a long battle with cancer.

== Selected discography ==
- Touch! Don't Touch! (2006; Wergo), together with Lydia Kavina & Kammerensemble Neue Musik Berlin
- Theremin: Russia with Love (2006; Intuition)
- Sonata Mix Dwarf Cosmos (2007; Rune Grammofon), together with Susanna
- Moonstruck (2008; Intuition)
