= Rheinsberg Palace =

Palace in Rheinsberg, Brandenburg, Germany

- Schloss Rheinsberg
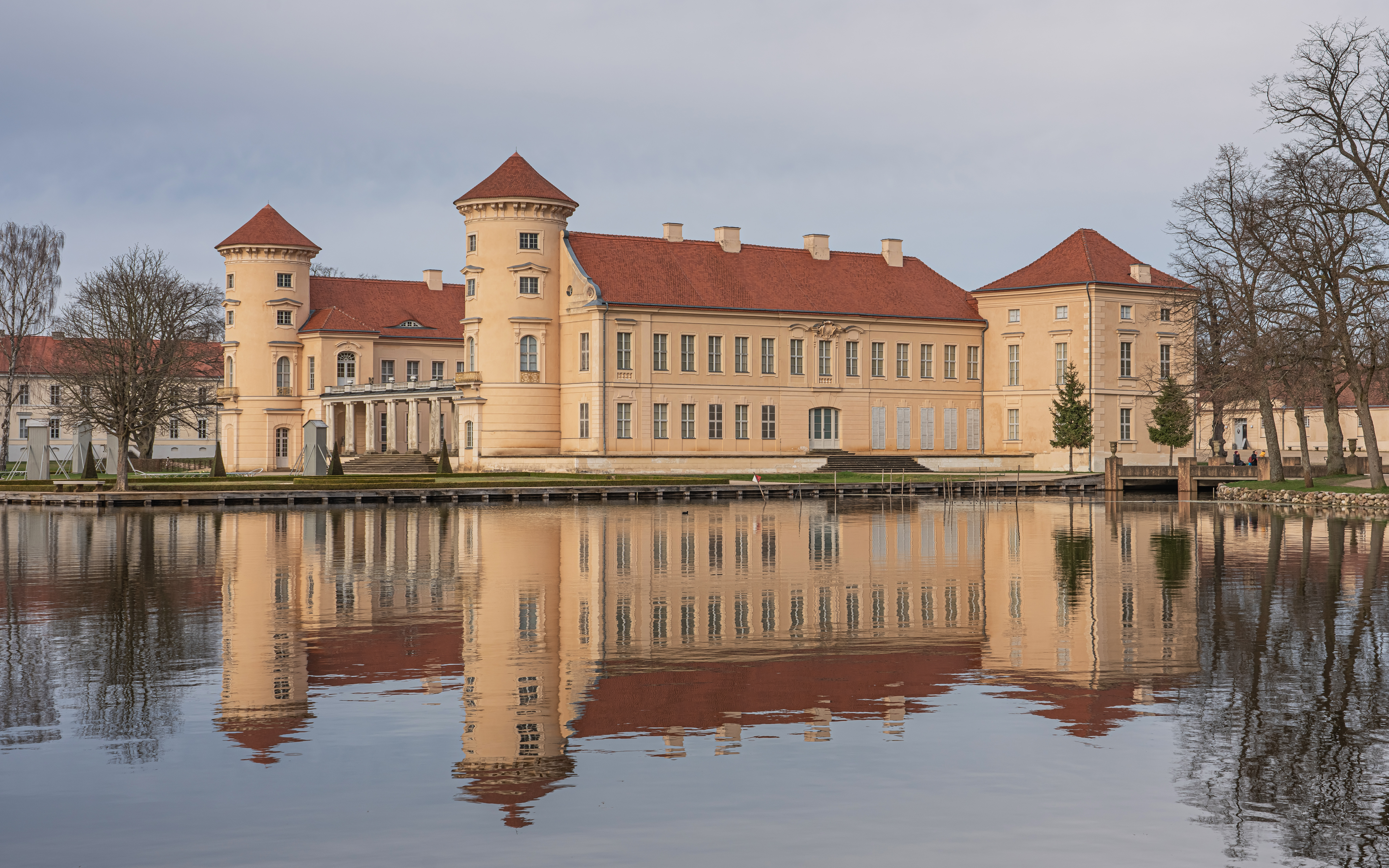

- Location within Brandenburg Location within Germany

General information
- Status: Cultural
- Architectural style: Frederician Rococo
- Location: Rheinsberg, Germany
- Coordinates: 53°5′55″N 12°53′22″E
- Owner: Berlin-Brandenburg Foundation for Prussian Palaces and Gardens

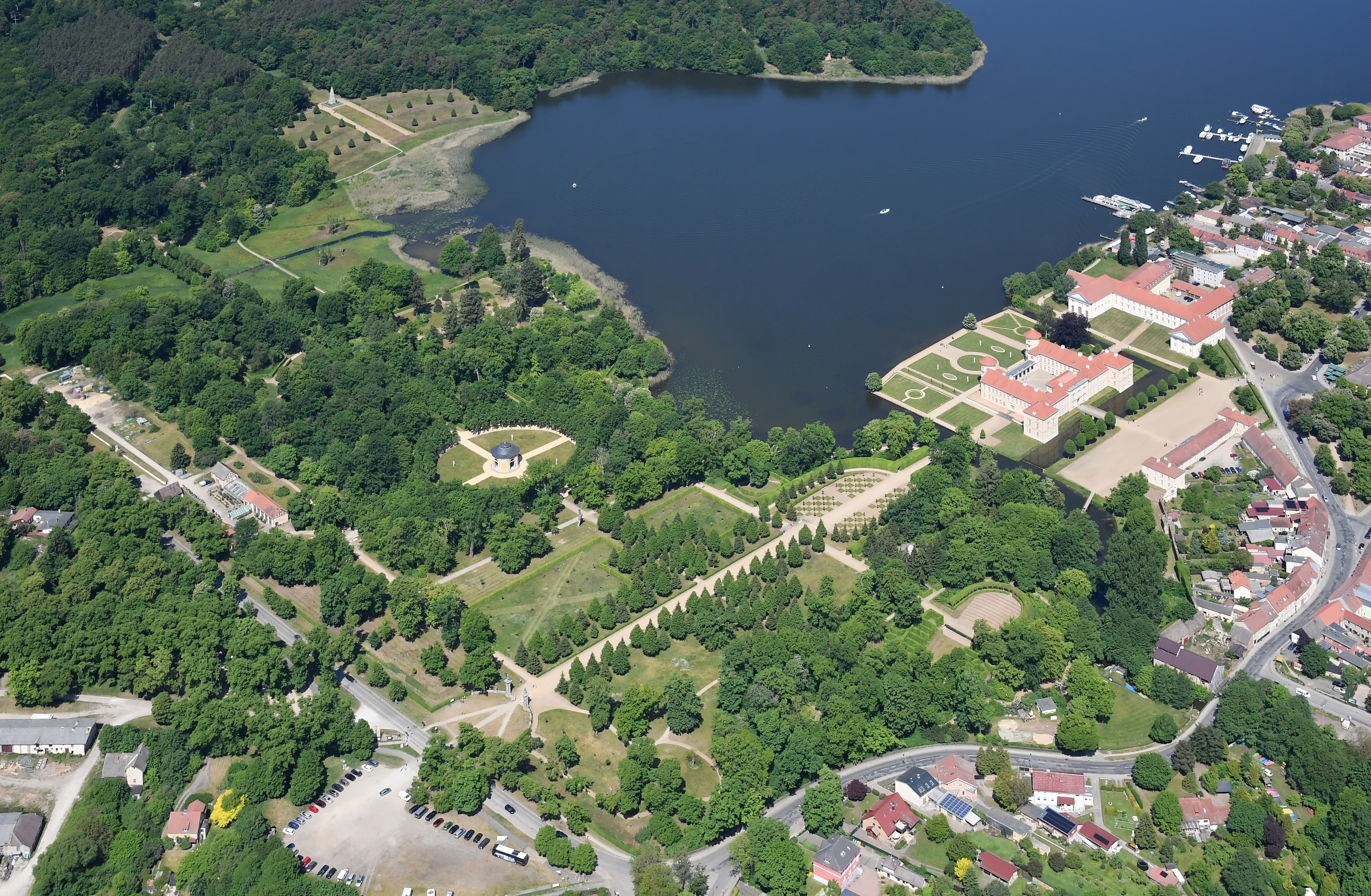
Aerial view of Rheinsberg Palace and its gardens

Rheinsberg Palace (German: Schloss Rheinsberg) lies in the municipality of Rheinsberg, about 100 kilometres (62 mi) northwest of Berlin in the German district of Ostprignitz-Ruppin.

The palace on the eastern shore of the Grienericksee is a classic example of the so-called Frederician Rococo architecture style and served as a basis for Sanssouci Palace.

== History ==
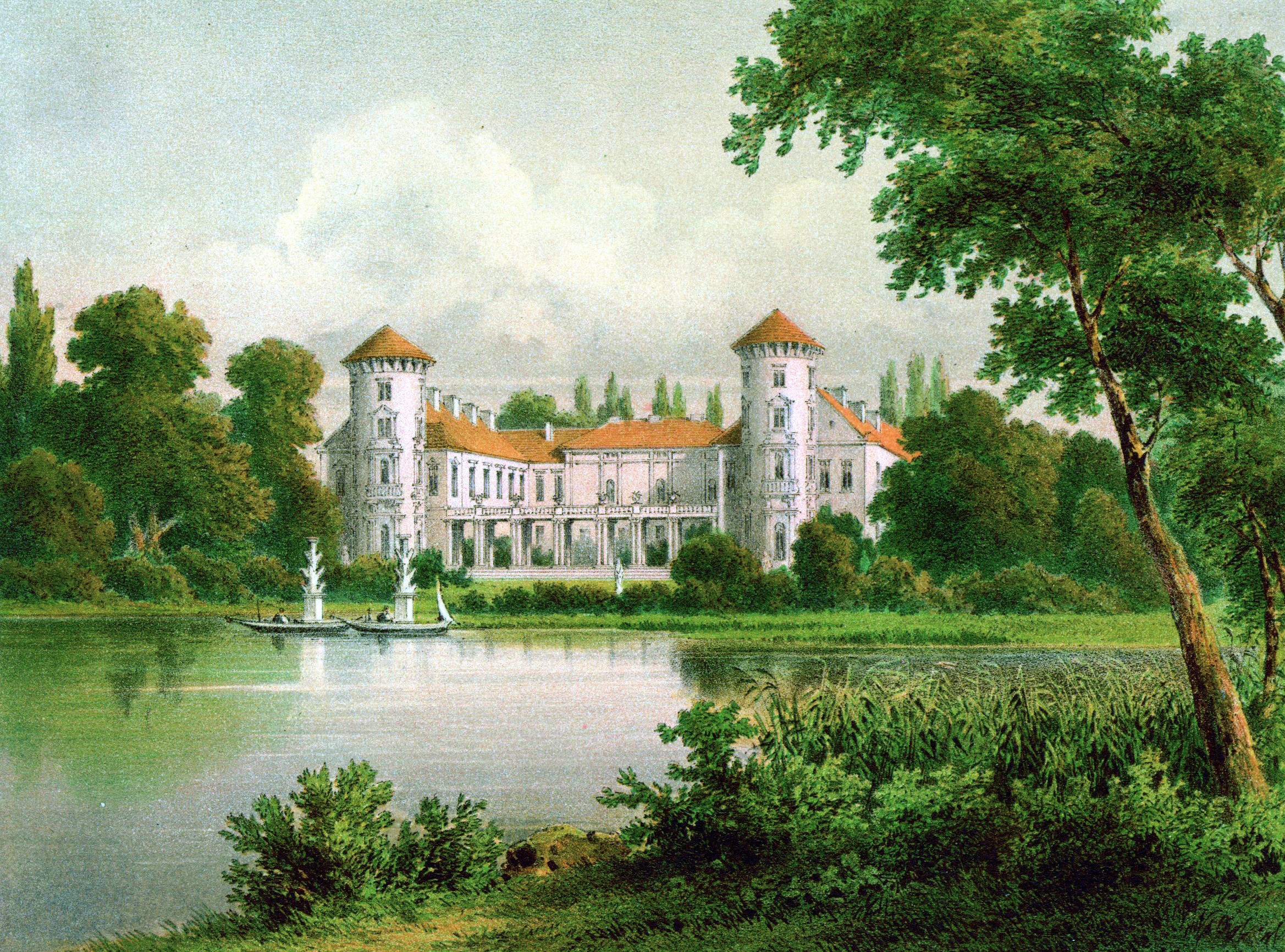
Rheinsberg Palace around 1860, Alexander Duncker collection

In the Middle Ages a moated castle stood on the site of Rheinsberg Palace. The von Bredow family had acquired the lordship of Rheinsberg through marriage in 1464 from the von Platen and had a water castle built on this spot in 1566 in Renaissance style. It was badly damaged during the Thirty Years' War. In 1618, was sold to Kuno von Lochow. When his line died out, the castle went to Prince-Elector Frederick William, who gifted it to his General, Franz du Hamel. With the permission of the elector, he sold it to Benjamin Chevenix de Beville. He sold it in March 1734 for 75,000 thalers to the Prussian king, Frederick William I.

Frederick William in turn gave it to his son, Crown Prince Frederick, later King Frederick the Great for his loyalty. In 1736 he moved with his wife, Princess Elisabeth Christine to the southern wing of the castle. In the years up to 1740 Frederick had the castle considerably extended and improved by the architects Johann Gottfried Kemmeter and Georg Wenzeslaus von Knobelsdorff, who learned his architectural craft from Kemmeter. An upper floor was added to the single-storey building and the East Wing extended by 25 metres.

Frederick himself always described his years at Rheinsberg Palace as the "happiest of his life". His time in Rheinsberg ended in 1740 with his accession to the throne.

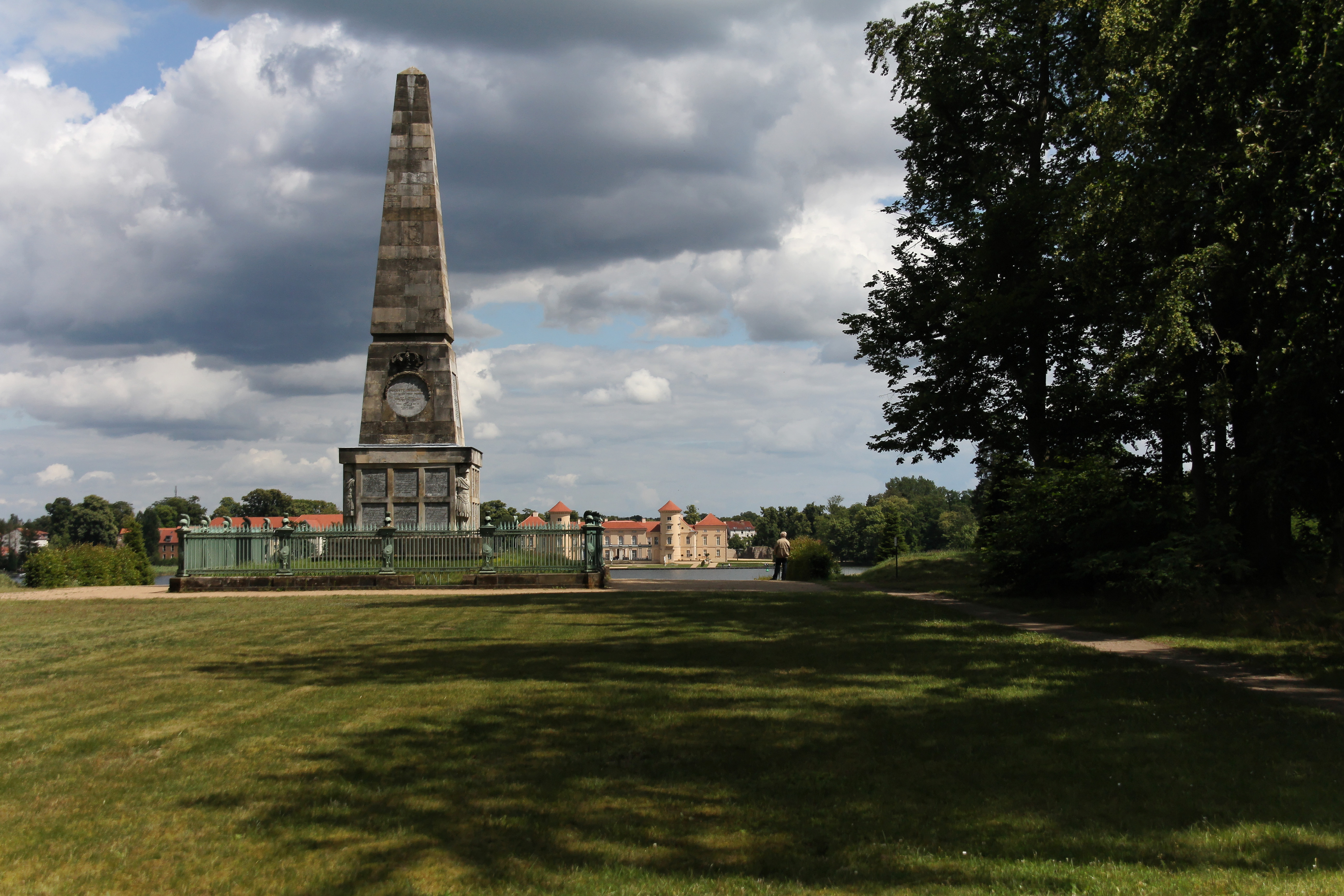
Rheinsberg obelisk

Four years later he gave it to his younger brother Henry, who moved there in 1752 with his wife, Princess Wilhelmina of Hesse-Kassel. The king also had a grand palace built for him in Berlin between 1748 and 1753 which now houses the main building of Humboldt University. The art-loving prince went on to extend and embellish the castle and its adjoining park. In 1786, Georg Friedrich von Boumann and Carl Gotthard Langhans completed the palace to its original plans.

Langhans stayed in Rheinsberg for a few weeks in 1766, and had made plans for Prince Henry, which were implemented in subsequent years by his building director, Carl Wilhelm Hennert. In 1774, Prince Henry had the palace theater attached to the cavalier house. He brought in traveling drama groups and even performed operas with an improvised orchestra.

In 1785/86, Bouman built the two pavilions at the castle, which Langhans probably tore down. The Rheinsberg obelisk erected in the early 1790s on the opposite bank of the lake within sight of the palace was intended to honor the memory of Frederick II's and Henry's brother Prince Augustus William of Prussia, who had fallen out of favor, as well as of many officers close to Henry and some of whom were also little appreciated by the king, who in his opinion had rendered outstanding services in the Silesian wars. Henry had the names of these little appreciated officers immortalized on commemorative plaques on the obelisk.

Henry had also his tomb built in the form of a broken pyramid in the garden while he was still alive, in which he was buried after his death in 1802. Henry wrote the French inscription himself.

The palace rose to literary fame when it was described by Theodor Fontane in his book Wanderungen durch die Mark Brandenburg ("Walks through the March of Brandenburg") and by Kurt Tucholsky in his Rheinsberg. Ein Bilderbuch für Verliebte (translated as Rheinsberg. A Storybook for Lovers). Until government expropriation in 1945, Rheinsberg Palace was owned by the House of Hohenzollern.

During East German times, the palace housed a diabetes clinic. Today the palace and its gardens belong to the Prussian Palaces and Gardens Foundation Berlin-Brandenburg. After lengthy and extensive restoration, the palace is now a museum and home to the Kurt Tucholsky Literature Museum. Since 1991, the Federal and State Rheinsberg Music Academy has been accommodated in the former Cavalier House (Kavaliershaus), and runs the palace theatre. Also since 1991 the International Opera Festival has taken place in the palace theatre, the courtyard and the open-air theatre (Heckentheater).

== Literature ==
- Theodor Fontane: Wanderungen durch die Mark Brandenburg, Vol. 1 (County of Ruppin) "Rheinsberg"
- Andrew Hamilton: Rheinsberg. Das Schloß, der Park, Kronprinz Friedrich und Bruder Heinrich. Selected and edited by Franz Fabian. Based on a translation from English by Rudolf Dielitz (first published in London in 1872), Aufbau Verlag, Berlin 1992, ISBN 3-351-02111-9
- Ludwig Sternaux: Mein kleines Sanssouci. Schloß Rheinsberg und seine Erinnerungen, Hahn's Erben, Berlin 1936
- Generaldirektion der Staatlichen Schlösser und Gärten Potsdam-Sanssouci (Hrsg.): Rheinsberg : Eine märkische Residenz des 18. Jahrhunderts. Ausstellung vom 21. - 29. Juni 1985 im Schloss Rheinsberg (= Katalog der Ausstellung zur 650-Jahrfeier der Stadt Rheinsberg 1985, Gestaltung: Herbert Sander), Generaldirektion der Staatlichen Schlösser und Gärten Potsdam-Sanssouci, Potsdam 1990
- Christian von Krockow: Rheinsberg. Ein preußischer Traum, E. A. Seemann, Leipzig 1992, ISBN 3-363-00554-7
- Stiftung Preußische Schlösser und Gärten Berlin-Brandenburg (eds.): Schloß Rheinsberg. Amtlicher Führer der Stiftung Schlösser und Gärten Potsdam-Sanssouci, Stiftung Preußische Schlösser und Gärten Berlin-Brandenburg, Potsdam 1993
