= Lydia Kavina =

Russian musician

Lydia Kavina Лидия Евгеньевна Кавина
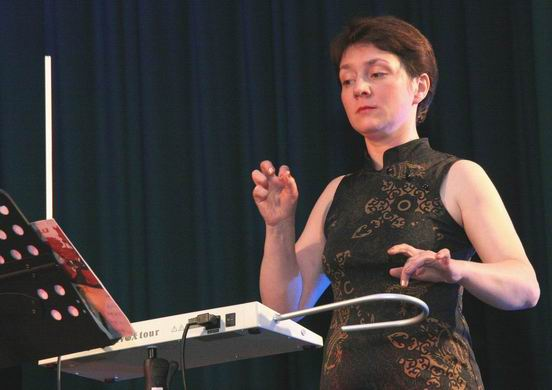
- Kavina in 2005

Background information
- Born: Lydia Evgenevna Kavina; 8 September 1967 (age 58); Moscow, Russia
- Instrument: Theremin
- Website: www.LydiaKavina.com

Lydia Evgenevna Kavina (Russian: Лидия Евгеньевна Кавина; born 8 September 1967) is a British-Russian theremin player, based in Oxfordshire, UK.

The granddaughter of Léon Theremin's first cousin, Soviet anthropologist and primatologist Mikhail Nesturkh, Kavina was born in Moscow and began studying the instrument under the direction of Léon Theremin when she was nine years old. Five years later, she gave her first theremin concert, which marked the beginning of a musical career that has led to numerous concert, theatre, radio and television performances around the world.

Kavina has appeared as a solo performer at such prestigious venues as the Royal Albert Hall in London, Elbphilharmonie in Hamburg, Royal Concertgebouw in Amsterdam, Bolshoi Zal (Great Hall) of the Moscow Conservatory, Moscow International Art Centre with National Philharmonic of Russia under Vladimir Spivakov and Bellevue Palace in Berlin, the residence of the German President. She has also performed at leading festivals, including Caramoor with the Orchestra St. Luke's, New York's Lincoln Center Festival, Holland Music Festival, Martinu Festival, Electronic Music Festival in Burge and Moscow “Avantgarde”.

Kavina performs most of the classical theremin repertoire, including popular works for theremin by Bohuslav Martinů, Joseph Schillinger, and Spellbound by Miklós Rózsa, as well as Equatorial by Edgard Varèse and the lesser known Testament by Nicolas Obouchov.

In addition to giving concerts, Kavina is a composer of music for theremin and teaches the instrument in Western Europe, Russia and the United States. Her video tutorial “Mastering the Theremin”, recorded with Moog Music in 1994, was one of the key moments in the renaissance of theremin performing art around the world. Lydia is the author of the online ThereminSchool Carolina Eyck was one of her students. Together with the London Philharmonic Orchestra, she played theremin for Howard Shore's soundtrack of the Oscar-winning film Ed Wood, as well as for eXistenZ (also by Shore), The Machinist and The Electrical Life of Louis Wain. She played the role of theremin performer in the film Me and Kaminski (2015) Additionally, Kavina has recorded several compact discs and is the subject of an instructional video from the theremin manufacturer Moog Music. She was also featured in stage productions such as Alice and The Black Rider (both conceived and directed by Robert Wilson, with music by Tom Waits) at the Thalia Theater in Hamburg, and in collaboration with the Russian experimental surf band Messer Chups.

Lydia Kavina is an active promoter of new experimental music for the theremin. Her recent project Nicht zu fassen for theremin and accordion, together with Roman Yusipey, includes works by S.Gubaidulina, J.Cage, V.Poleva, as well as Kavina's compositions, it was performed in Germany and Ukraine. In collaboration with Barbara Buchholz and Kamerensemble Neue Musik Berlin, Kavina performed a number of concerts of contemporary works for theremin in Germany in 2005–2007 as part of the Touch! Don't Touch! – Music for Theremin project.

The most notable project of her recent career is her theremin solo in 4th Symphony by Ch. Ives, under Kent Nagano (Hamburg and Zurich, 2018–2019), Bählamms Fest, an opera by Olga Neuwirth (Vienna, Hamburg, Luzern, Bochum, 1999–2021) The Little Mermaid, a ballet by Lera Auerbach, choreographed by John Neumeier in Copenhagen New Opera Haus (2005), Hamburg State Opera (2007–2025), Korea National Ballet (2024-2025) and The National Ballet of China in Beijing (2012). Kavina also played the solo in Danny Elfman's UK concert tour with BBC concert orchestra and London Concert orchestra (2013–2014).

Kavina is dedicated to theremin education. Her video tutorial “Mastering the Theremin”, recorded with Robert Moog in 1994, was one of the key moments in the renaissance of theremin performing art around the world. Lydia also created ThereminSchool online platform. Among Lydia’s students are Carolina Eyck, Barbara Buchholz, Masami Takeuchi.

Kavina has completed a number of her own compositions for theremin including a Concerto for Theremin and Symphony Orchestra, first performed by the Boston Modern Orchestra under the direction of Gil Rose.

Kavina holds a degree in composition from The Moscow Conservatory, where she also completed a postgraduate assistantship program.

== CDs ==
- Music from the Ether, Mode records, 1999
- Concerto per Theremin. Live in Italy, Teleura, 2000
- Touch! Don't Touch! – Music for Theremin with Barbara Buchholz, Wergo, 2006
- Spellbound!, Mode records, 2008
- Waves&Strings, with Sviatoslav Belonogov, Art service, 2020

Collaborations

- Music for Films III Music by Brian Eno, Opal Records, 1988
- Ed Wood: Original Soundtrack Recording Music by Howard Shore, Hollywood Records, 1994
- eXistenZ, Soundtrack Music by Howard Shore, RCA Victor, 1999
- Black Black Magic Music by Messer Chups, Solnze Records, 2002
- Crazy Price Music by Messer Chups, Solnze Records, 2003
- Vamp Babes, Upgrade Version Music by Messer Chups, Solnze Records, 2004
- Baehlamms Fest Music by Olga Neuwirth, Kairos, 2003
- The Machinist, Soundtrack Music by Roque Baños, Melodramma Records, 2005
- Theremin 100 by The NY Theremin society, 2020

== Videos ==
- Mastering the Theremin, Big Briar, 1995
- Concerto per Theremin. Live in Italy, Teleura, 2001
- Making the Steamroller Fly, 1997, as herself.
