= Messer Chups =

Surf rock band from Saint Petersburg, Russia

Messer Chups is a surf rock band from Saint Petersburg, Russia. The group was formed in 1998 by composer and guitarist Oleg Fomchenkov.

== History ==
The band was founded by Oleg Fomchenkov (also known as Oleg Gitarkin) who had previously performed with Oleg Kostrov as Messer für Frau Müller. Messer Chups is often considered a "spin-off" band of Messer für Frau Müller. In the group's name, "Messer" is taken from the German word for "knife" and "Chups" from Chupa Chups lollipops.

The band was originally a duo of Gitarkin on bass guitar and Annette Schneider on synthesizer. During 2000–2002 Messer Chups consisted of Gitarkin and Igor Vdovin on synths.

In 2003, Oleg Tarasov, the producer of Messer Chups and head of their home label Solnze Records, invited the world famous theremin player Lydia Kavina to join them. Together they have released several albums and reworked their previous releases. In 2005, Messer Chups became a duo consisting of Gitarkin and Svetlana "Zombierella" Nagaeva on bass. In 2007, they became a trio, with drummer Denis "Kashchey" Kuptsov from the band Leningrad. In 2008, they changed their drummer to Alexander Belkok, and Alexander Skvortzov became their vocalist.

The group's music was used for the soundtrack for the dating sim Monster Prom.

== Musical style ==
Messer Chups combines surf rock and traditional Russian music, as well as using samples from historical recordings, lounge music, and vintage film soundtracks. Their live shows feature projections of old horror and sci-fi movies. Gitarkin has cited Link Wray and The Ventures as influences.

== Members ==
As of 2019, the group's line-up consisted of:

- Oleg "Guitaracula" Fomchenkov (also known as Oleg Gitarkin) – guitar
- Svetlana "Zombierella" Nagaeva – bass, vocals
- Evgeny Lomakin (also known as "Rocking Eugene") – drums

== Discography ==
=== Messer Chups ===
Albums:

- Чудовище и Чудовище (Monster & Monster) (1999) MC, CD [Re-released as Miss Libido 2000, Monster & Monster Upgrade Version]
- Невеста Атома (Bride Of The Atom) (2000) MC, CD
- Vamp Babes (2000) MC, CD [Re-released as Vamp Babes Upgrade Version]
- Black Black Magic (2002) CD
- Crazy Price (2003) CD/LP
- Hyena Safari (2005) CD/LP
- Zombie Shopping (2007) CD
- Heretic Channel (2009) CD/LP
- Bermuda 66 (2010) CD/LP
- Surf Riders from The Swamp Lagoon (2011) CD/LP
- Church of Reverb (2013) CD/LP
- The Incredible Crocotiger (2015) CD/LP
- Spooky Hook (2015) CD/LP
- Taste the Blood of Guitaracula (2017) CD/LP
- Mondo Harp (2019) CD/LP
- Don't Say Cheese (2020) CD/LP
- Visiting the Skeleton in the Closet (2021) CD/LP
- Dark Side of Paradise (2024) LP/CD

EP's:

- Twin Peaks Twist (2019) 7"
- Jokermobile (2019) 7"
- The Curse of Catzilla (2020) 7"
- New Wave or Surf Wave (2020) LP
- Night Stripper (2023) 7"
- Blood and Black Lace (2023) 7"
- Don't Worry, Be Creepy! (2024) Digital

Compilations:

- The Best Of Messer Chups: Cocktail Draculina Vol. 1 (2002) CD
- Messer Story In Videos 1992-2006 (2006) DVD
- Best Of The Best (2008) LP/CD
- Messer Chups Video (2008) DVD
- Best Of (2015) CD
- The Voice of Zombierella (2016) LP
- The Best Of Messer Chups: Cocktail Draculina Vol. 2 (2017) Digital/LP
- My Favorite Tracks (2018)
- The Adventures of Zombierella & Guitaracula (2019) CD/LP [Upgrade Version Re-release in 2022]
- Spook-O-Rama... The Best Of (2019) CD/LP
- Lost Tracks (2020) Digital/LP

=== Messer für Frau Müller ===
- Merry Bormans (1991) unreleased
- Happy End Dead (1992) MC, CD released in 2000
- Little Joys (1992) MC, CD released in 2000
- Senjors Crakovjac (1993) MC, LP 1994, CD 2000
- Icicle-Murders (1995) MC
- Nechelovek-Vidimka (1996) MC
- „Hello, Superman!“ (1998) MC, CD
- Second Hand Dreams (2000) MC, CD
- Allo, Superman! (2000) CD incl. 3 bonus tracks
- Hyper Utesov Presents (2001) CD
- Second Hand Dreams (2001) CD incl. 3 bonus tracks
- Treugol'nik, Chert I Tochka (2003) CD
- Remixodelica (2005) CD
- Triangle, Dot & Devil (2006) CD
- Danger Retrobolik (2006) CD
- Messer Chups & Messer für Frau Müller video DVD 2006
- Wake Up The Dead (2008) CD / (2009) LP
