= Cavalier house =

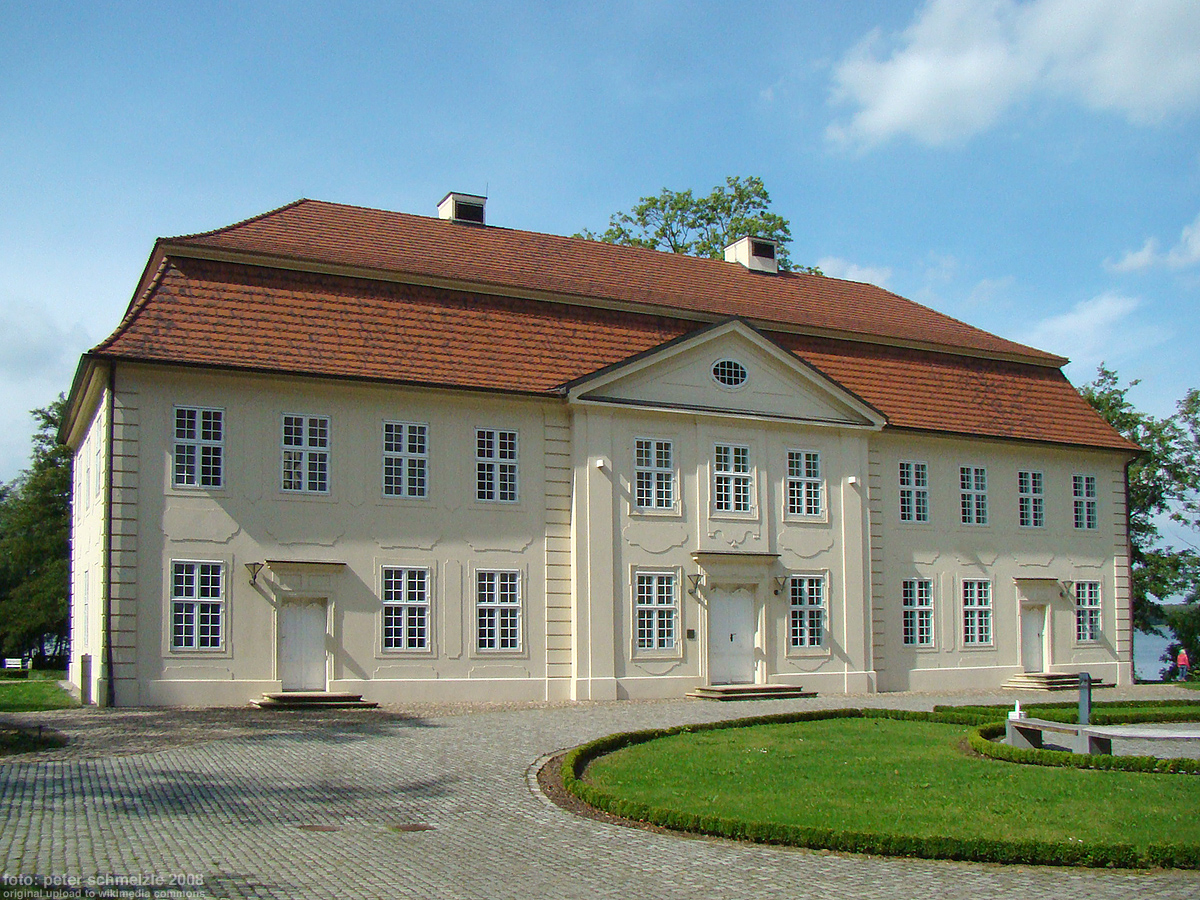
The cavalier house on Mirow's "palace island" in Mirow

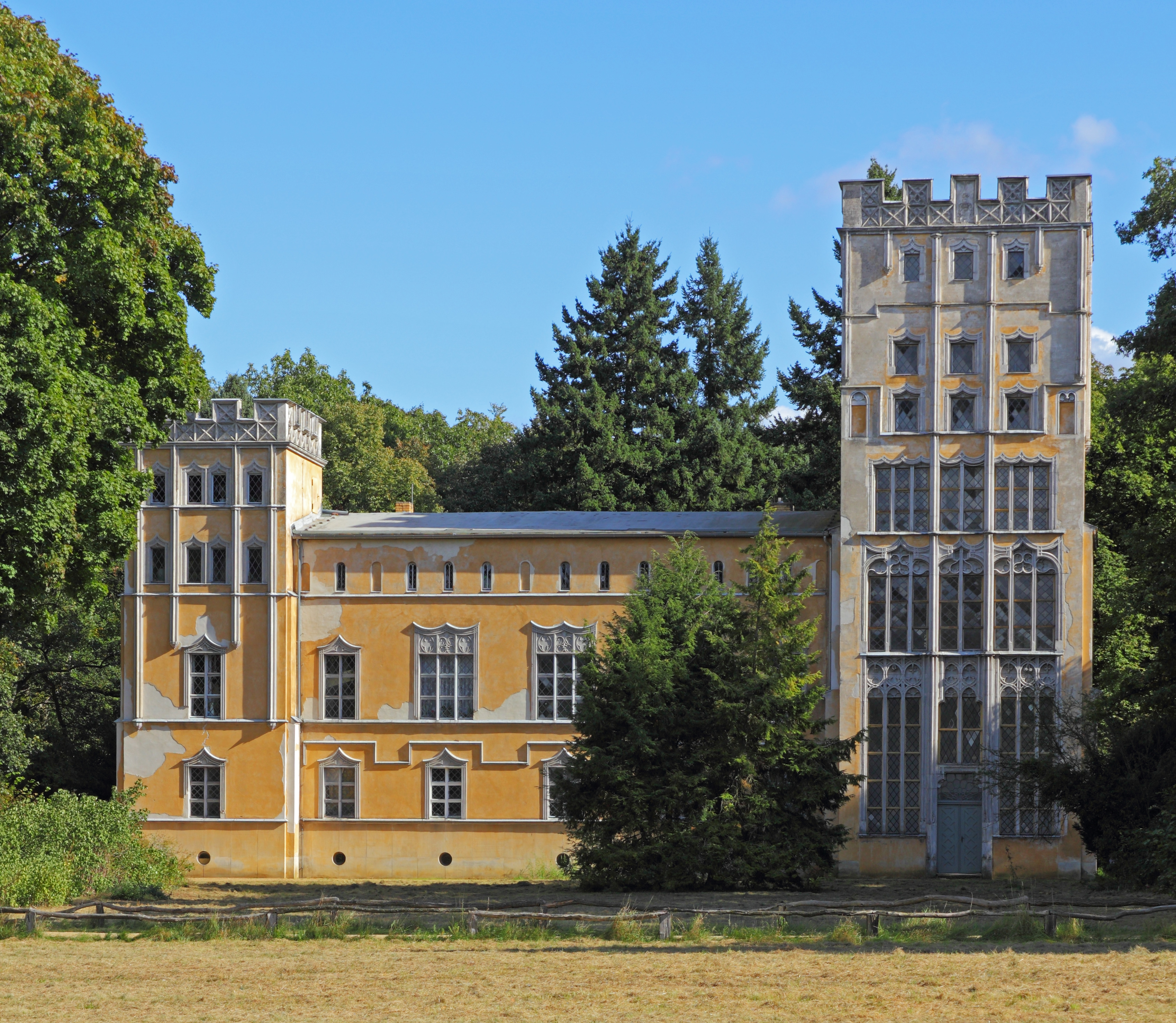
The cavalier house on the Pfaueninsel in Berlin

A cavaliers' house or cavalier house (from "cavalier" meaning horseman or cavalryman) was a building that formed part of the ensemble of a stately home, palace or schloss and was used to accommodate the royal or princely household. They emerged in the Baroque era.

The name is derived from the original use of such buildings for accommodating cavalrymen. Later it became synonymous for the building attached to a palace or stately home that was not used by the royal family themselves, but by courtiers, high officials, couriers or guests.

In Baroque ensembles, cavalier houses and palaces were frequently around a cour d'honneur and could be linked by galleries or stand entirely separate. There were no hard and fast rules, so that a cavalier house could sometimes be found in the palace park. Depending on the area, size and importance of the actual residenz – and the status of its noble family – a cavalier house could even be a schloss in its own right or take on a more modest appearance sometimes resembling a burgher's house.

== Examples ==
=== Austria ===
- Cavalier House, Klessheim, Klessheim Palace, Salzburg state

=== Germany ===
- Cavalier house, Gifhorn, Lower Saxony, today a museum
- Cavalier house inside the larger Schloss Pyrmont, Bad Pyrmont, Lower Saxony
- Cavalier house, Langenargen, Baden-Württemberg
- Cavalier house, Spremberg, Brandenburg
- Cavalier houses at Altenstein Palace, Bad Liebenstein, Thuringia
- Cavalier houses of Königs Wusterhausen, Brandenburg
- Cavalier house and hunting lodge in Darmstadt-Bessungen, Hesse
- Cavalier house at Moritzburg Castle, Saxony
- Cavalier house of Echzeller Burg, Echzell, Hesse, which is actually a palace
- Cavalier house of Rheinsberg Castle, Brandenburg

== Literature / Sources ==
- Hans-Joachim Kadatz: Seemanns Lexikon der Architektur, Seemann, Leipzig, 2001. ISBN 3363006136.
