= Forum Zeitgenössischer Musik Leipzig =

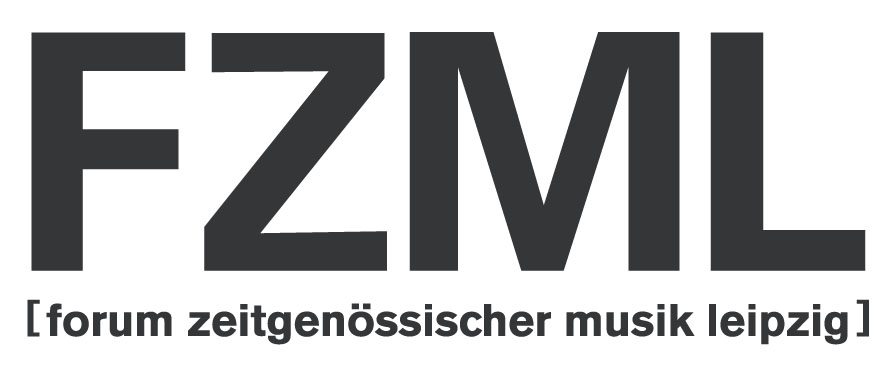
- Founded: 8 November 1990
- Type: Cultural institution
- Purpose: Project based communication of contemporary music
- Location: Leipzig
- Region served: Worldwide
- Key people: Thomas Christoph Heyde (Chair)
- Website: www.fzml.de

The Forum Zeitgenössischer Musik Leipzig [FZML] (Forum of Contemporary Music Leipzig) is a non-profit organisation situated in Leipzig and an independent cultural organisation for the project-based communication of contemporary music.

== Description ==
Originally, the intention of the organisation was to support contemporary music in the area of Leipzig. In the middle of the 1990s the activities of the FZML became more international with the projects "GRENZREGIONEN", "Heimat Moderne", "Experimentale 1" and, most recently (2012), the "CAGE100" festival. So today mentioning Leipzig in the name is more to stress the geografical placement of the main office.

Since its founding, the organisation acts as a mediator between the music resp. the composers and the music scene resp. the audience. The word "Forum" expresses the open position as a mediator. Rooting in that term is also a neutral position towards stylistic and aesthetic criteria of selection that are often connoted to "Modern" or "Contemporary Music".

== History ==
The FZML was founded in 1990 by members of the important/considerable Ensemble for avant-garde music in East Germany Gruppe Neue Musik Hanns Eisler and by other artists, authors, scientists and journalists. The common goal was to spread contemporary music and to foster a vital dialogue about music and arts in present time. In 1993, the concert series "MUSIK-ZEIT" (music-time) became the first big success of the FZML. Apart from many world premieres it was central to promote the international music scene. In addition, the first educational project ("Schulmusikkonzerte" school-music concerts) was established to communicate contemporary music to the up-growing generation. In 1999, Thomas Christoph Heyde became the artistic director. One year later the FZML moved into its first business premises. Starting in 2001, the FZML mounted annually one festival and several concert series. This continuity strengthened the popularity of the society and the FZML became established as an inherent part of Leipzig's cultural life. The governments of Leipzig, Saxony and even of the Federal Republic started to support the FZML. In 2006 the festival series "MachtMusik" started, in 2007 the concert series "FreiZeitArbeit" (FreeTimeWork/LeisureWork) followed. Some educational and social projects followed the next years. With the 20th anniversary, the friends’ association "Freunde und Förderer des FZML" was founded. It supports the work of the FZML financially and in non-material ways. Until now, the yearlong international festival "CAGE100" with its worldwide more than 100 events in 2012/’13 was the biggest project for the FZML since its founding.

== Principles ==
Since each project has its own new and individual tasks, the FZML enhances its methods continuously to consider the needs of the particular project. Within the society this process is called "spontaneous institutionalisation", it stresses the importance of flexibility and adaptability for the FZML.

== Financing ==
Since 2011 the FZML receives institutional funding of Leipzig's municipal government. All additional money is collected from foundations, cultural budgets, private sponsors and donations and also the friends’ society "Freunde und Förderer des FZML".

== Conception ==
The work of the FZML is based on a connection of different points of view of contemporary music. Focused on bridging the distance between sensuous and intellectual perception the FZML is led by the idea that contemporary music is as much an object of sensation as of discourse. The methods of examining the phenomenon of contemporary music reach from traditional concerts through to experiments with performances’ modalities and the active participation of the audience in artistic processes. All these methods form a dramaturgical unity, focusing on the reflection of the particular work or topic. One example for the holistic curatorial and dramaturgical approach is the festival "CAGE100" which celebrated the 100th birthday of John Cage. The FZML transferred his artistic concepts directly to the festival, its contents and its form. For the work "Party-Pieces" 125 composers participated in composing one piece after an idea of John Cage. As measured by the number of participants, "Party-Pieces" is the biggest teamwork of composers in western music history. Another feature of the project is its global range. Although all composers were living and working in Germany or the US during the project, a majority came from more than a dozen countries (e.g. Canada, France, Poland, Russia, Japan) so that not only an aesthetic but also a cultural multi-perspectivity could be laid out. For the projects, the FZML works together with other institutions, free artists and even companies, societies and associations. Beyond that the society engages musicians and ensembles individually according to the needs of the project and also other artists and scientists from Germany and abroad. The FZML does not have its own venue for their concerts but rather chooses the venues after curatorial and dramaturgical aspects. According to that, the society can refer to over 200 performance spaces during its existence.

== Projects and concerts since 2006 ==
The following list gives an overview over all projects and concerts realised by the FZML since 2006. The particular productions are pooled and listed chronologically in the categories festivals, concert series, various concerts, and education and workshops.

=== Festivals ===
2016

ALTZEIT NEU – 25 years FZML (9–11 February 2016)

2012/2013

CAGE100 (6 July 2012 - 17 October 2013)

2010

20 Jahre FZML – Jubiläumsfestival (14th Oktober - 16 October 2010) (20th anniversary's festival)

Festival series "MachtMusik" (PowerMusic or MakeMusic)

2009

sex.macht.musik - Festival für erotische Musikkultur (4–6 December 2009) (sex.power.music – Festival of erotic music-culture)

2008

Machtmusik - Festival für sportliche Musikkultur (18–21 September 2008) (PowerMusic – festival of athletic music culture)

2007

MachtMusik - Festival für religiöse Musikkultur (11–16 September 2007) (PowerMusic – Festival for religious music culture)

2006

MachtMusik – Festival für politische Musikkultur (13–23 September 2006) (PowerMusic festival for political music culture)

=== Concert Series ===
Concert Series "FreizeitArbeit" (LeisureWork)

2011

- Waldkonzert (10 September 2011) (Forest-Concert)
- Bunkerkonzert (25 November 2011) (Bunker-Concert)
- Rathauskonzert (10 December 2011) (Town-Hall-Concert)

2010

- Flughafenkonzert (12 June 2010) (Airport-Concert)
- Fast-Food-Konzert (11 December 2010) (Fast-Food-Concert)
- Krankenhauskonzert (26 November 2010) (Hospital-Concert)

2009

- Friedhofskonzert (22 May 2009) (Cemetery-Concert)
- Bahnhofskonzert (27 July 2009) (Station-Concert)
- Fahrradkonzert (13 September 2009) (Bike-Concert)
- Bordellkonzert (20 November 2009) (Brothel-Concert)

2008

- Dampferkonzert (1 May 2008) (Steamship-Concert)
- Arbeitsamtkonzert (1 July 2008) (Employment-Agency-Concert)
- Nachtwanderkonzert (2 August 2008) (Night-Walk-Concert)

2007

- Badekonzert (14 July 2007) (Bathing-Concert)
- Picknickkonzert (19 August 2007) (Picnic-Concert)
- Straßenbahnkonzert (16 November 2007) (Tram-Concert)

Concert Series "Butterfahrt" (Booze Cruise)

2011

- 1. Deutsches Stromorchester (11 May 2011) (1st German Electricity-Orchestra)
- Ensemble Work in Progress - [Berlin] (22 June 2011)
- Ensemble Lux [Vienna] (23 November 2011)

2010

- Besucher |: Praesenz | Aer [Israel], Ensemble Nikel [Germany] (10 November 2010)

=== Various concerts ===
2016

- Party Pieces (20 January 2016)

2014

- LEIPZIGNOIR 1914 (17 December 2014)

2012

- Eisler | Sohn ohne Stadt – Eine musikalisch-szenische Revue zum 50. Todestag von Hanns Eisler (3 October 2012) (Eisler | Son without city – a musically and scenically revue for the 50th anniversary of Hanns Eisler's death)
- Concert - Staatsphilharmonie Timișoara (12 April 2012)

2009

- "Den Sieg verfehlt..." Konzert zum Wendejubiläum (19 September 2009) ("Missed the Victory…" Concert for the Tournaround's anniversary)

=== Education and workshops ===
2009

- Bild dir deine Meinung (25 March - 18 June 2009) (Forge your opinion!)
- Relaunch: Romeo + Julia (25 June 2009)

2008

- New Religion (25–29 February 2008)
- Workshops im Wortstreit (25–29 February 2008) (Workshops in contention)
- Mixtape (3–7 March 2008)

== Awards ==
- Advancement Award of the Sächsischer Initiativpreis für Kunst und Kultur der Kulturstiftung des Freistaates Sachsen (2009) (Saxonian proactive award for arts and culture of the cultural foundation of Saxony)
- Special Award "Schule der Toleranz" (2009) (school of tolerance)
- Deutscher Musikeditionspreis des Deutschen Musikverlegerverbandes e.V. "Best Edition" (2014) (German music edition award of the German music-publishers’ union)

=== Nominations ===
- Nomination of Cage100 for "Kulturmarke des Jahres 2013" (cultural brand of the year 2013)

== Literature ==
- Glaetzner, Burkhard (1990). "Ansprache. In Eigener Sache". MusikTexte 37: 61.
- Thomas Christoph Heyde (2010). "20 Jahre FZML: Ein Psychogramm" (PDF; 3,4 MB), In: 20 Jahre FZML - Jubiläumskatalog, 24–42, 2010, FZML self-publishing.
- Thomas Christoph Heyde (2012). "B A C H | C A G E. Leipzig und Cage100" (PDF; 2,1 MB) In: positionen. Texte zur aktuellen Musik, ed. 93: 50–52.
