= Albrecht von Massow =

German musicologist

Albrecht von Massow (born in 1960) is a German musicologist. Since 2000 he has held a professorship for 20th century music and systematic musicology at the joint Institute for Musicology Weimar-Jena.

== Life ==
Born in Bonn, von Massow studied musicology, philosophy and modern German literature at the University of Freiburg from 1982 to 1988. As a research assistant, he contributed to the Handwörterbuch der musikalischen Terminologie. From 1988 to 1991 he did his doctorate under Hans Heinrich Eggebrecht. His dissertation dealt with "Half-world, culture and nature in Berg's Lulu and was graded summa cum laude. From 1993 von Massow gave courses in analysis at the musicological seminar of the University of Freiburg and organised weekend seminars together with Eggebrecht as part of the Studium generale. He was a founding member of the Society for Musik & Ästhetik. In 2000, Von Massow won his habilitation at the Technical University of Dortmund with the thesis "Musikalisches Subjekt – Idee und Erscheinung in der Moderne".

Since then he has held a professorship for 20th century music and systematic musicology at the joint Institute for Musicology of the Hochschule für Musik Franz Liszt, Weimar and the Friedrich-Schiller-Universität Jena. Von Massow is founder, supervisor and co-editor of the series KlangZeiten - Musik, Politik und Gesellschaft, which has been published since 2004. Since 2012 he has been a member of the board of the Landscape Park Nohra Foundation. Since October 2017 he is president of the German Liszt Society.

== Publications ==
- Halbwelt, Kultur und Natur in Alban Bergs Lulu. (Beihefte zum AfMw 33), Stuttgart 1992.
- Musikalisches Subjekt. Idee und Erscheinung in der Moderne. Rombach, Freiburg in Br. 2001.
- Ästhetik und Analyse, in Musikalischer Sinn. Beiträge zu einer Philosophie der Musik, edited by Alexander Becker and Matthias Vogel, Frankfurt 2007, pp. 129–174.
- Published with Michael Berg, Knut Holtsträter: Die unerträgliche Leichtigkeit der Kunst. Ästhetisches und politisches Handeln in der DDR. Böhlau Verlag, Köln/Weimar/Wien 2007.
  - includes: Probleme einer humanistischen Legitimation von Kunst. pp. 163–175.
- Musikalische Autonomieästhetik zwischen Geistes-, Natur- und Sozialwissenschaften, in Laboratorium Aufklärung 1, edited by Olaf Breidbach, Daniel Fulda and Hartmut Rosa, Munich 2010, pp. 169–197.
- Gehversuche musikwissenschaftlicher Vergangenheitsbewältigung, in Freiburger Universitätsblätter, H. 195, 2012, pp. 13–50.
- Published with Thomas Grysko, Josephine Prkno: Ein Prisma ostdeutscher Musik: Der Komponist Lothar Voigtländer. Böhlau Verlag, Köln/Weimar/Wien 2015.
- Die unterschätzte Kunst. Musik seit der Ersten Aufklärung. Böhlau Verlag, Cologne 2019.
