= Kammerensemble Neue Musik Berlin =

Music ensemble based in Berlin, Germany

Kammerensemble Neue Musik Berlin, also known as KNM Berlin, is a music ensemble for contemporary music based in Berlin, Germany.

The ensemble was founded in 1988 in East Berlin, by students of the Hochschule für Musik "Hanns Eisler". The players collaborated with composers such as Mark Andre, Georg Katzer, Chris Newman, Helmut Oehring, Dieter Schnebel and conductor Roland Kluttig. They are described as "a group which combines openness to the experimental music tradition with a high level of playing in the conventional mode." Musicians who have been involved with the ensemble include Barbara Buchholz, Philipp Maintz, Michael Mantler and Graham Waterhouse.
