= Rheinsberg Music Academy =

German music school

- Musikakademie Rheinsberg
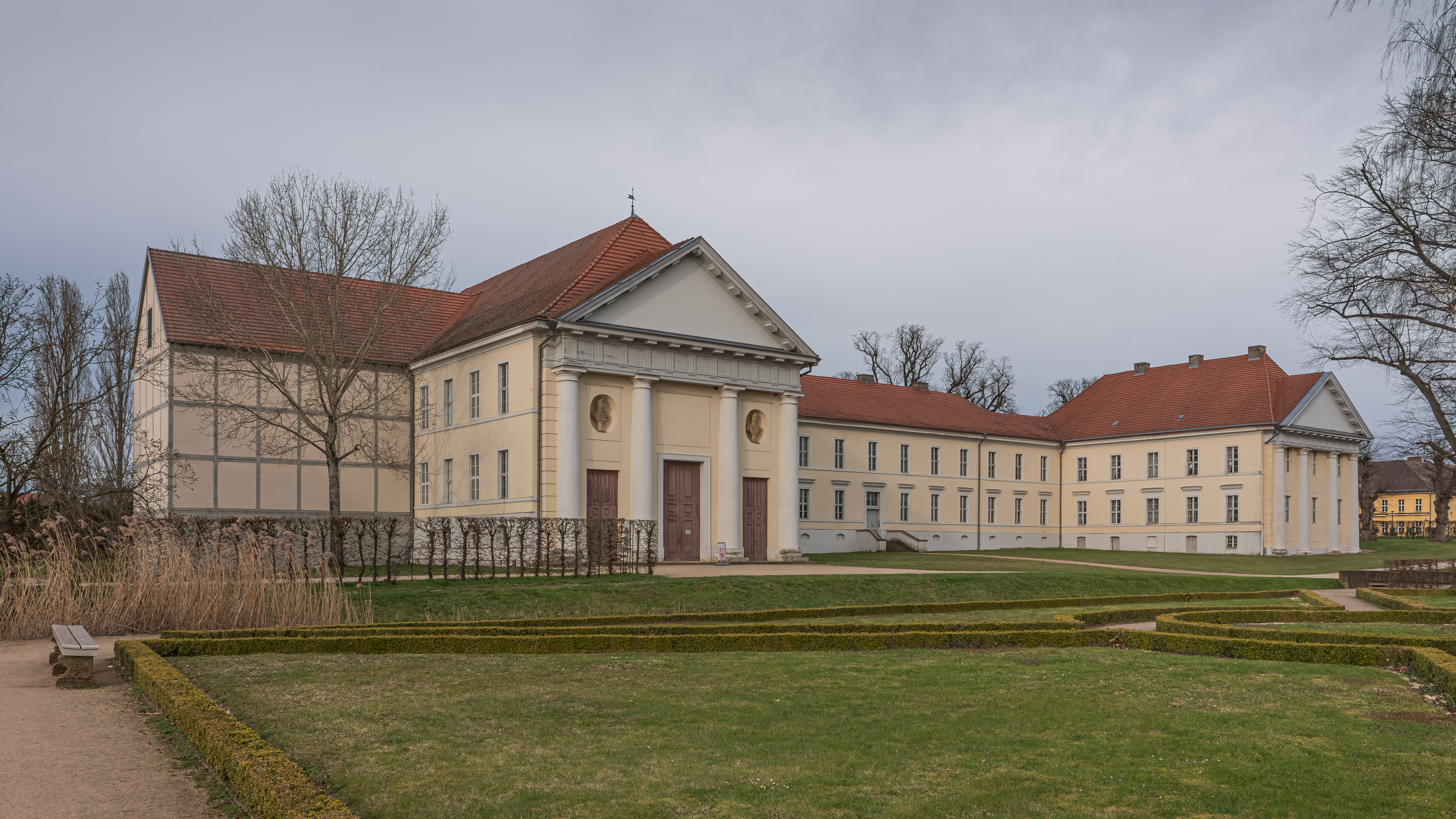
- Kavalierhaus of Schloss Rheinsberg, seat of the academy

Location
- Rheinsberg, Brandenburg; Germany
- Coordinates: 53°05′58″N 12°53′23″E

Information
- Type: Music academy
- Established: 1991
- Founder: Ulrike Liedtke
- Website: Official website

The Rheinsberg Music Academy (German: Musikakademie Rheinsberg) is an academy for music in Rheinsberg, Brandenburg, Germany. It was co-founded by Ulrike Liedtke and is now a national and state institution, educating both lay people and professionals. It is based at Schloss Rheinsberg and uses the theatre there for performances.

== History ==
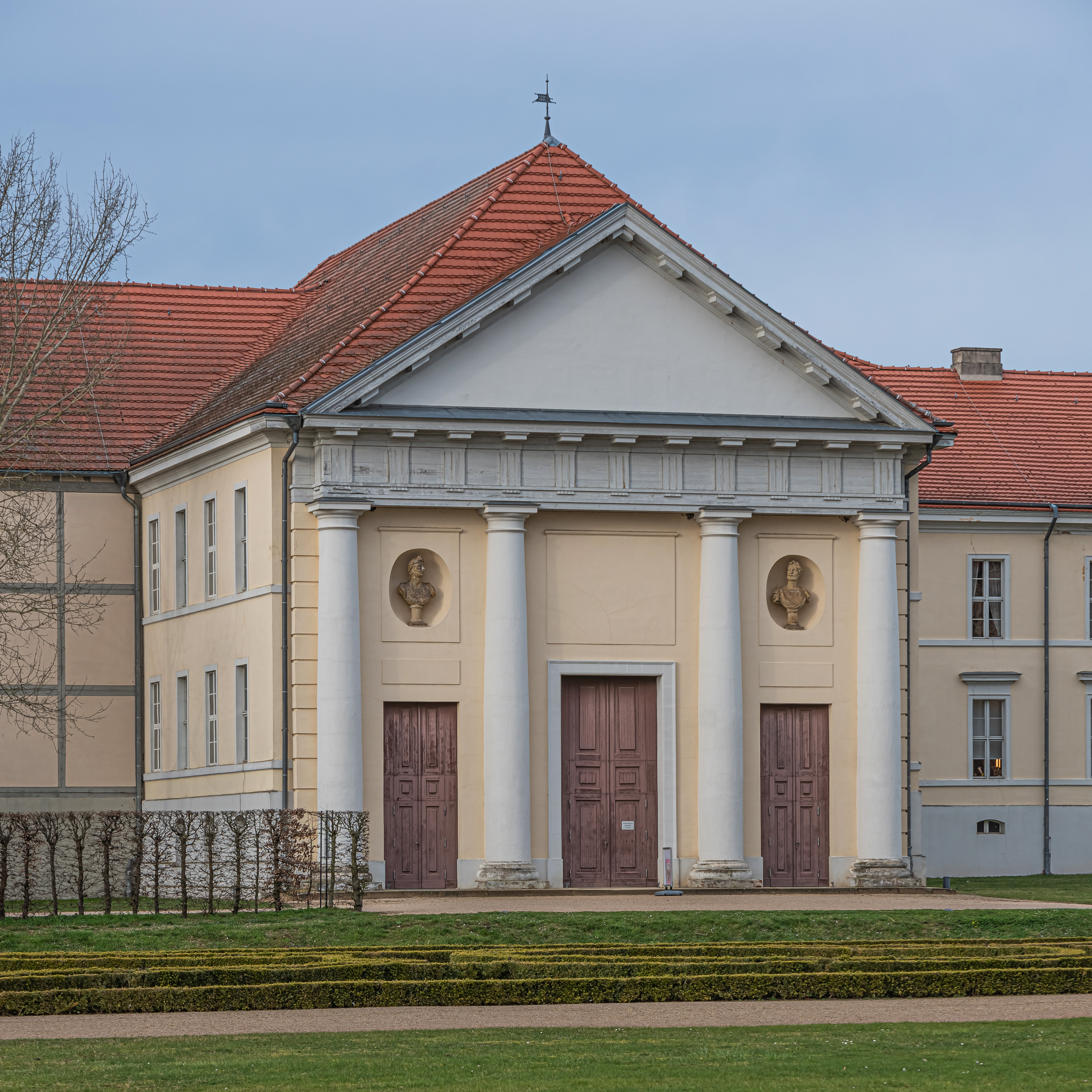
Schlosstheater Rheinsberg

Rheinsberg Music Academy is a facility for young performers on the grounds of Schloss Rheinsberg, co-founded by the musicologist Ulrike Liedtke in 1991. In 2001, it became a national academy (Bundesakademie), which has been run from 2014 by Musikkultur Rheinsberg, supported by the Ministry of Culture of Brandenburg (Ministerium für Bildung, Jugend und Sport (Brandenburg)), the Ostprignitz-Ruppin district and the town of Rheinsberg. As of 2020, the artistic director is Georg Quander and the director is Felix Görg; the CEO of Musikkultur Rheinsberg is Thomas Falk.

As an educational institution, the academy conducts workshops, master classes, and scientific seminars (Kolloquien) related to music. In 2019/20, master classes were given by singer Waltraud Meier, stage director Harry Kupfer and conductor René Jacobs, among others. A focus is the performance of works by young composers and composers who were neglected during the GDR regime. Some compositions were commissioned by the academy to be premiered in Rheinsberg. Annually, around 40 courses and 130 events are held, attracting 17,000 visitors.

The Kavalierhaus, which had deteriorated, was restored after the Wende and reopened in 1999 as the seat of the institution. The main hall is a simple modern room within the historic walls. Events of the academy and the opera festival Kammeroper Schloss Rheinsberg are held there and at the Schlosstheater. Both institutions reside in the Kavalierhaus.
