= Juliane Klein =

German composer

Juliane Klein (born 3 November 1966) is a German composer and publishing director.

== Life ==
Born in Berlin, Klein began studying clarinet, piano, musical composition and improvisation at the Hochschule für Musik "Hanns Eisler" in Berlin as a young student in 1978 and was a lecturer for composition at the same university from 1989 to 1992. Together with Thomas Bruns, she founded the "Kammerensemble Neue Musik Berlin" in 1987, which she directed until 1991. From 1993 to 1997 she continued her postgraduate studies with Helmut Lachenmann in Stuttgart. In 1999 she founded the music publishing house "Edition Juliane Klein".

As a composer, she received residency scholarships at the Pushkinskaya Desyat St. Petersburg (1995), the Cité internationale des arts (1997), in Künstlerhof Schreyahn (2001), in the artists' courtyard "Die Höge" (2002), and at the Rheinsberg Music Academy (2003) and the Villa Massimo ("Casa Baldi"), Rome (2004). In 2006 she was awarded the Förderungspreis Musik of the Kunstpreis Berlin.

In 2010 Klein opened her own Christian Science practice in Berlin.

== Compositional work ==
Klein's catalogue includes works for music theatre, solo pieces, songs, and chamber and orchestral music, but also compositions for children and young people. The Berlin, Hanover and Stuttgart State Operas have given premieres of her experimental opera productions. She has written commissioned works for the Scharoun Ensemble of the Berlin Philharmonic, Deutschlandfunk Cologne, the Freiburger Barockorchester, the Donaueschinger Musiktage, the Days for New Chamber Music in Witten, and the "Ultraschall-Festival" in Berlin.

== Work ==
=== Solo pieces ===
- Solo for violoncello (1988)
- Verloren for violin (1992/3)
- Die Dinge haben keinen Rand for harpsichord (1996)
- Aus der Wand die Rinne 1 for violoncello (1996)
- Aus der Wand die Rinne 2 for violin (1996)
- Aus der Wand die Rinne 3 for oboe (1998)
- Aus der Wand die Rinne 4 for Akkordeon (1998)
- Aus der Wand die Rinne 5 for piano (1999)
- Aus der Wand die Rinne 6 for clarinet (1999)
- Fünfmal Schreyahn for Percussion (2001)
- Aus der Wand die Rinne 8 for saxophone (2003)
- 38 for bass clarinet (2004)
- 38b for recorder (2005)
- Aus der Wand die Rinne 10 for electronics (2006)
- Aus der Wand die Rinne 11 for theremin (2006)
- Aus der Wand die Rinne 12 for video (2006)
- smartcard 1 for clarinet (2006)
- Aus der Wand die Rinne 9 for horn (2009)
- Aus der Wand die Rinne 13 for flute (2013)
- Aus der Wand die Rinne 14 for double bass (2014)

=== Chamber music (2–4 instruments) ===
- Fünf Lieder nach Gedichten von Gottfried Benn for soprano, flute and guitar (1986/7)
- Strahlen for flute and harp (1989)
- Stimmen inmitten der Wand for saxophone and flute (1990)
- NETT for alto flute, viola, double bass and guitar (1991)
- es1 for two pianos (1991)
- Drei Hände voll Sand for string quartet (1994)
- ..waren... I + II for violin, violoncello and piano (1995)
- Deckweiß for clarinet, bass clarinet, flute and trombone (1998)
- Chanson-Tanz I for accordion, double bass and clarinet (1998)
- Fünfgezackt in die Hand for oboe and percussion (2000)
- Lass for sub-bass recorder and bass flute (2001)
- Spät 2 for soprano and clarinet (2001)
- Konzertstück I for flute, percussion and piano (2001)
- kehren/Blätter for soprano, voice and piano (2001)
- Geviert for baritone, trumpet, trombone and double bass (2002)
- vexations for voice and percussion (2002)
- mit for oboe, violoncello, piano and percussion (2003)
- gedrillt for flute, percussion and guitar (2003)
- 3 Lieder nach Klopstock for soprano and piano (2004)
- Das Geheimnis der verzauberten Juwelen for narrator and piano (2004)
- Leicht wie Blätter sich legen for percussion and oboe (2005)
- Das Dicke Kind for narrator and piano (2006)
- Die Perlenprinzessin, 7 Plastikpiraten und ein Stoffhund for narrator and piano (2006)
- ungetrennt for string quartet (2007)
- Bauwerk 1 for 2 violins, viola (2010)
- In Erinnerung an … Glück for 3 trombones, organ (2010)

=== Chamber music (5–15 instruments) ===
- Der Nachtwandler I for flute, saxophone, violin, violoncello, piano and speaker (1990)
- Der Nachtwandler II for clarinet, horn, double bass, guitar and soprano (1991)
- Die Stockung for oboe, saxophone, violin, violoncello and guitar (1992)
- UEBERBLEIBSEL for five players ad lib (1992)
- ... und Aufstieg for flute, clarinet, oboe, bassoon, horn (1992)
- Ohne Tageslicht I Adaptation for bass flute, bass clarinet, horn, trombone, violoncello and double bass (1995)
- s-o-l-c-h-e w-o-l-k-e-n for 7 instruments, voice and conductor (1996)
- Fünf Margeriten for flute, clarinet, saxophone, trombone, violin, viola, violoncello, double bass and percussion 1+2 (1997)
- Am Fenster for flute, clarinet, violoncello, guitar, percussion and soprano (1999)
- Ausgleich for flute, clarinet, oboe, violoncello, double bass, percussion, piano and soprano (2000)
- gehen for string quintet, flute, oboe, clarinet, trumpet, trombone, percussion, soprano and baritone (2000)
- keineß for soprano, flute, clarinet, violin, viola, violoncello and piano (2000)
- Ohne Titel for five players (2000)
- inmitten for 11 bells (2001)
- Gegenstände durchdringen for wind sextet (2001)
- Abschied – Ankunft for voice, violoncello 1 + 2, accordion and piano (2001)
- EINSATZ (reflection) for Tubax and 10 instruments (2002)
- Sendungen 1-24 for voice, violoncello, accordion, piano and slide projection (2002)
- 37 for saxophone quartet and string quartet (2004)
- se vuoi for theremin, violin, violoncello, piano and percussion (2004)
- weit – weiter for violin, viola, violoncello, double bass, flute, oboe, clarinet, bassoon, trumpet, trombone and horn (2005)

=== Orchestral work ===
- Aufriss for 18 strings without conductor (5-5-4-3-1) (1999)
- vertikal for strings (5-5-3-3-1), 2 oboes, flute, clarinet, 2 bassoon and 2 horns (2001)
- Suite for string trio, piano, soprano, baritone and 13 instruments (2002)
- PSALM 23 for soprano, baritone and 17 instrumentalists (2003)
- ... und folge mir nach for baroque orchestra: strings (4-4-2-2-1), 2 flutes, 2 oboes, 2 bassoons, 2 horns and harpsichord (2005)
- ERDE for orchestra (2 flutes, 2 oboes, 2 clarinets, 2 bassoons, 2 trumpets, 2 horns, 2 trombones, tuba, 3 drums, strings: 8-8-6-6-4), student groups (2010)

=== Operas ===
- westzeitstory, table opera in scale H:0 for mezzo-soprano, tenor, trumpet, percussion, keyboard, speaker and 4 table players (2001/6)
- Arabische Pferde, airport opera for soprano, baritone, 2-4 extras, string quartet, flute, clarinet, trombone, percussion (2002)
- Hyp'Op, music-theatrical project for child actors, soprano, baritone, orchestra and 5 mobile players (2003)
- Glück, music theatre after Gottfried Benn and Oscar Wilde for 4 soloists, choir and ensemble (2006)
- Der unsichtbare Vater, after the book of the same name by Amelie Fried, Mobile Opera for tenor and saxophone, percussion, accordion (2009)
- Es ist einfach ..., for music theatre project for voices, school orchestra, choir and hip-hop group (2010)
- Irgendwie Anders. Große Fassung für Bühne, for voice, piano, children's choir, performers (2011)
- Allein, for 1 female singer, 1 male singer, 6 instrumentalists (clarinet, accordion, piano, percussion, violin, cello) and 30 contemporaries (2012)

== CDs ==
- Portrait-CD "Juliane Klein: mit / gehen / Fünfgezackt in die Hand / Aus der Wand die Rinne / Suite" WERGO (WER 65592)
- se vuoi for theremin, violin, violoncello, piano and percussion on Touch! Don't Touch! Music for Theremin WERGO (WER 66792)
- ... und folge mir nach for Baroque orchestra. On "About Baroque. Neue Kompositionen für das Freiburger Barockorchester" Harmonia mundi France (HMC 905187.88)

== Literature ==
- Eva-Maria Houben (ed.): Juliane Klein. Pfau-Verlag, Saarbrücken 2002, 89 pages, ISBN 3-89727-190-7.
- Nina Ermlich-Lehmann: Article "Klein, Juliane", in Die Musik in Geschichte und Gegenwart. Allgemeine Enzyklopädie der Musik, 2nd revised edition, supplement, Kassel among others 2008, ISBN 3-476-41033-1, cols. 401–403.
