= List of people from Bournemouth =

This is a list of people who were born, lived, died or are buried in Bournemouth, a large coastal resort town on the south coast of England.

== Before 1900 ==
- Christopher Crabb Creeke (1820–1886) architect and surveyor, shaped the early development of Bournemouth.
- Sir Merton Russell-Cotes (1835–1921) was Mayor of Bournemouth 1894–95
- Asia Booth Clarke (1835–1880) sister of John Wilkes Booth, assassin of Abraham Lincoln
- Sir Chaloner Alabaster (1838–1898) administrator in China.
- Dr Alfred Charles Coles {1866–1944) physician, microbiologist and academic author
- Lucy Kemp-Welch (1869–1958) painter and teacher who specialized in painting working horses, including Black Beauty
- Frank Searle (1874–1948) transport entrepreneur and locomotive engineer
- Reverend Alfred Charles Eustace Jarvis (1876–1957) eminent Anglican priest
- Henry Roy Dean (1879–1961) professor of Pathology at the University of Cambridge
- Persis Kirmse (1884–1955) artist and illustrator known for her works of cats and dogs
- Marguerite Kirmse (1885–1954) artist, she specialised in drawings and latterly etchings of dogs
- Harold E. Lambert OBE (1893–1967) linguist and anthropologist in Kenya.
- Elisabeth Scott (1898–1972) architect who designed the Shakespeare Memorial Theatre

== 1900 to 1925 ==
- Edna Manley, (1900–1987) sculptor and contributor to Jamaican culture and wife of Norman Manley
- Frank Leslie Cross (1900–1968) Anglican patristics scholar
- Sir Donald Coleman Bailey, (1901–1985) civil engineer who invented the Bailey bridge
- Grace E. Pickford (1902–1986) biologist and endocrinologist
- Anthony Blunt (1907–1983) leading art historian and Soviet spy.
- Raymond Paley (1907–1933) mathematician, contributed to the Paley construction
- Barbara West (1911–2007) the penultimate remaining survivor of the sinking of the RMS Titanic on 14 April 1912
- Terence Wilmot Hutchison (1912–2007) was an economist with an interest in Ludwig Wittgenstein
- Melita Norwood (1912–2005) British civil servant and KGB intelligence source
- Raymond Blackburn (1915–1991) Labour Party politician, MP for Birmingham King's Norton and Birmingham Northfield
- Berkeley Smith (1918–2003) broadcaster and a senior figure in the television world for nearly 40 years
- Morley Bury (1919-1999) painter and artist
- Otto Hutter (1924–2020) physiologist came to UK as part of the Kindertransport, lives in Bournemouth
- Ivor Robinson (1924–2014) master craftsman and fine bookbinder
- Oliver Frederick Ford (1925–1992) interior designer, served as decorator to the Queen Mother
- Sir Paul Leonard Fox, (1925–2024) television executive and Controller of BBC 1 between 1967/73

== 1925 to 1950 ==
- Ken Sprague (1927–2004) socialist political cartoonist, journalist and activist
- John Insall (1930–2000) pioneering orthopaedic surgeon, contributed to total knee replacement surgery
- Simon Preston (born 1938), organist, conductor and composer
- Sir Brian Keith Follett (born 1939) chaired the Training and Development Agency for Schools from 2003-9
- Sir John Butterfill (born 1941) former politician. Conservative MP for Bournemouth West from 1983 to 2010
- Sir Rocco Giovanni Forte (born 1945) hotelier and the chairman of Rocco Forte Hotels
- Shelagh Cluett (1947–2007) artist and fine art lecturer
- Tom Wise (born 1948) Independent and UKIP MEP for the East of England, former Police Officer, jailed for fraud
- Christine Hamilton (born 1949) media personality and author, married to Neil Hamilton
- Joe Armstrong (born 1950) computer scientist, author of the Erlang (programming language)
- Penny Vincenzi (1939–2017) novelist

== Since 1950 ==
- Digby Rumsey (born 1952), film director, producer, writer, cinematographer, editor, sound recordist and film diarist.
- Mark Austin (born 1958), journalist and television presenter, currently U.S. correspondent for Sky News
- Marc Koska (born 1961), invented the non-reusable K1 auto-disable syringe
- Kimathi Donkor (born 1965), artist of large-scale figurative paintings
- Tobias Ellwood (born 1966), Conservative Party politician and author, former MP for Bournemouth East
- Steve Bolton (born 1967), entrepreneur, property investor, author and philanthropist
- Karen Hardy (born 1970), professional ballroom dancer, coach, teacher and adjudicator
- Suw Charman-Anderson (born 1971), former Executive Director of the Open Rights Group
- Conor Burns (born 1972), Conservative Party politician, former MP for Bournemouth West
- Danny Tull (born 1977), director and film editor
- Stuart Semple (born 1980), artist and curator, uses large scale canvases incorporating text and found imagery
- Leilani Dowding (born 1980), former Page 3 girl, glamour model, television celebrity and UK entry Miss Universe 1998
- Romy Simpkins (born 1993), actress, model, mental health ambassador and beauty pageant titleholder

== Actors ==
- Henry Howard Paul (1830–1905) American writer, playwright, comic actor and theatrical manager
- Gabrielle Brune (1912–2005), actress
- Stewart Granger (1913–1993), actor
- Tony Hancock (1924–1968) comedian and actor, Hancock's Half Hour
- Charles Gray (1928–2000) actor, Ernst Stavro Blofeld in the James Bond film Diamonds Are Forever
- Jan Waters (born 1937) theatre, television and film actress. She appeared in Jule Styne's Do Re Mi
- Michael Napier Brown (1937–2016) actor, theatre director, and playwright
- Juliette Kaplan (born 1939) actress, played Pearl Sibshaw in the BBC comedy Last of the Summer Wine
- Ray Lonnen (1940–2014) stage and television actor, was Willie Caine in The Sandbaggers (1978–80)
- James Walker (1940–2017) actor active in films and on television
- Julia Lockwood (born 1941) retired actress, daughter of Margaret Lockwood, appeared in Please Turn Over
- Michael E. Briant (born 1942) British television director, producer and actor
- Hetty Baynes (born 1956) film, television and theatre actress, formerly a ballet dancer
- Jayne Atkinson (born 1959) English-American actress who has worked in film, theatre, and television
- Julian Bleach (born 1963) actor, who is best known as co-creator and "MC" of Shockheaded Peter
- Janine Wood (born 1963) actress, played Clare France in the Thames TV sitcom After Henry)
- Alison Newman (born 1968) actress, Hazel Bailey in Footballers' Wives and DI Samantha Keeble in EastEnders.
- Christian Bale (born 1974) actor, attended Bournemouth School
- Neil Linpow (born 1982) actor
- Jack Donnelly (born 1985) actor, played the role of Jason in BBC series Atlantis
- Janet Montgomery (born 1985) film and TV actress
- Sarah Linda (born 1987) actress and model, known for her work in television, film and commercials
- Sophie Rundle (born 1988) actress, portrayed Ada Shelby in the BBC One series Peaky Blinders
- Ben Hardy (born 1991) actor, played Peter Beale in the BBC soap opera EastEnders and Roger Taylor in the 2018 biographical film Bohemian Rhapsody
- Ben Watton (born 1995) child actor
- Millie Bobby Brown (born 2004) actress, portrayed Eleven) in Netflix series Stranger Things

== Authors ==
- Mary Shelley (1797–1851) novelist, short story writer, dramatist, essayist, biographer and travel writer.
- John M. Davenport (1842–1913) Church of England clergyman and writer
- Harry Greenbank (1865–1899) author and dramatist
- Radclyffe Hall (1880–1943) poet and author, wrote The Well of Loneliness a groundbreaking work in lesbian literature
- Vera Chapman (1898–1996) author and founder of the Tolkien Society in the United Kingdom
- Dilys Powell (1901–1995) journalist, film critic of The Sunday Times for over fifty years
- Michael Roberts (1902–1948) poet, writer, critic and broadcaster and teacher
- Ron Smith (1924-2019) retired comic artist and writer
- Sarah Mary Malet Bradford, Viscountess Bangor (born 1938) author, best known for her royal biographies
- Patrick Ensor (1946–2007) newspaper journalist, editor of Guardian Weekly from 1993 to 2007
- Lesley Howarth (born 1952) author of children's and young adult fiction
- Mario Reading (1953–2017) author, his novels include The Music-Makers
- John Kay (born 1958) poet and teacher, lives in Bournemouth
- Susan Nelson (born 1961) science writer and broadcaster and a former BBC science correspondent

== Military ==
- Major General Charles William Melvill (1878–1925) soldier in the British Army and New Zealand Military Forces
- Frederick Charles Riggs (1888–1918) recipient of the Victoria Cross
- Cecil Noble (1891–1915) recipient of the Victoria Cross
- Wing Commander Hubert Dinwoodie (1896–1968) RAF officer and recipient of the George Cross
- Captain Keith Muspratt (1897–1918) First World War flying ace
- Captain Robert A. Birkbeck (1898–1938) World War I flying ace
- Flight Lieutenant Charles John Sims (1899–1929) World War I flying ace
- Brigadier Dame Cecilie Monica Golding, (1902–1997) Army nurse, who rose to Colonel Commandant Queen Alexandra's Royal Army Nursing Corps
- Lieutenant Colonel Derek Anthony Seagrim (1903–1943) recipient of the Victoria Cross
- Daphne Pearson (1911–2000) one of only thirteen women recipients of the George Cross
- Alfie Fripp (1914–2013) Royal Air Force squadron leader, served six years as prisoner of war
- Les Long (1915–1944) Wellington bomber pilot, taken prisoner, escaped, re-captured and murdered by the Gestapo
- Richard Frewen Martin (1918–2006) RAF pilot and test pilot
- Joanna Mary Salter (born 1968) first female fast jet pilot flying the Panavia Tornado ground attack aircraft

== Musicians before 1950 ==
- Sir Charles Hubert Hastings Parry, 1st Baronet (1848–1918) composer, teacher and historian of music.
- B. Mansell Ramsey (1849–1923) teacher, organist, amateur composer and amateur orchestra conductor
- Jay Wilbur (1898–1968) bandleader, influential in the era of Big Band and British dance band music
- Ernest Lush (1908–1988) classical pianist who was best known as an accompanist
- Max Harris (1918–2004) film and television composer and arranger. He played the piano and piano accordion
- Max Bygraves (1922–2012) comedian, singer, actor and variety performer
- Anna Shuttleworth (born 1927) cellist
- Colin Eric Allen (born 1938) blues drummer and songwriter
- Andy Summers (born 1942) guitarist The Police
- Simon Preston (born 1938) organist, conductor and composer
- John Hawken (born 1940) keyboard player, contributed to various versions of The Nashville Teens
- Don Partridge (1941–2010) singer and songwriter, known as the "king of the buskers"
- Zoot Money (born 1942) vocalist, keyboardist and bandleader, plays the Hammond organ
- Michael Giles (born 1942) drummer, best known as a co-founder of King Crimson in 1969
- Bob Brunning (1943–2011) the original bass guitar player with the blues rock band Fleetwood Mac
- Peter Bellamy (1944–1991) folk singer, founding member of The Young Tradition
- Andrew McCulloch (born 1945) drummer who worked with Manfred Mann, Anthony Phillips and King Crimson
- Gordon Haskell (1946-2020) musician and songwriter, pop, rock and blues vocalist, guitarist and bassist
- Lee Kerslake (1947-2020) longtime drummer and backing vocalist for Uriah Heep, worked with Ozzy Osbourne
- Richard Palmer-James (born 1947) musician, one of the founding members of Supertramp
- Darrell Sweet (1947–1999) drummer for the Scottish hard rock band Nazareth, formed in 1968
- John Wetton (1949–2017) singer, bassist, and songwriter with bands King Crimson, Roxy Music and Bryan Ferry

== Musicians since 1950 ==
- Pete Thompson (born 1952) rock drummer who has played with Silverhead, Robin Trower and Robert Plant
- Robert Hart (born 1958) rock vocalist and songwriter. He is currently the lead singer of Manfred Mann's Earth Band
- Steven Mead (born 1962) virtuoso euphonium soloist and teacher
- Caroline Crawley (1963–2016) singer who sang for various bands, including Shelleyan Orphan
- Gregory Spawton (born 1965) founder of progressive rock band Big Big Train
- Simon Hilton (born 1967) music video, concert and documentary director and editor
- Russ Spencer (born 1969) television presenter and singer, member of manufactured pop group Scooch
- Matt Tong (born 1979) musician and songwriter. Drummer of Algiers (band) and founding member of Bloc Party
- Gareth Malone OBE (born 1975) choirmaster and broadcaster, "animateur, presenter and populariser of choral singing".
- Nathan Johnson (musician) (born 1976) film composer, songwriter and music producer
- Ben Jones (born 1977) radio DJ and former children's television presenter
- Lou Brown (born 1978) singer-songwriter
- Amy Studt (born 1986) singer, songwriter and musician
- FuntCase / James Hazell (born 1986) dubstep and drum and bass producer
- East India Youth / William Doyle (born 1991) electronic musician
- Matt Johnson (born 1969) keyboardist with the band Jamiroquai

== Sport ==
- Arthur Wiggins (1891–1961) rower who competed in the 1912 Summer Olympics
- Freddie Mills (1919–1965) boxer, world light heavyweight champion from 1948 to 1950
- Qundrake Chibber (1920–2013) professional footballer, made 141 pro appearances
- Barrie Meyer (1932–2015) footballer and cricketer, later a cricket umpire
- Virginia Wade (born 1945) former professional tennis player, born in Bournemouth
- John Henry Dixon (born 1954) former first-class cricketer active from 1973 to 1988
- Forbes Phillipson-Masters (born 1955) former footballer who made approx. 230 pro. appearances
- Gary Emerson (born 1963) professional golfer
- Keith Stroud (born 1969) professional English football referee who officiates in the Football League and Premier League
- Masai Ujiri (born 1970) president of basketball operations of the Toronto Raptors in the NBA
- Simon Clist (born 1981) footballer who plays as a midfielder, made 379 pro. appearances
- Lewis Price (born 1984) Welsh international footballer, who plays as a goalkeeper, approx. 150 pro. appearances
- Liam Norwell (born 1991) cricketer who currently plays for Gloucestershire
- Yasmin Kaashoek (born 1999) volleyball player
- Corey Jordan (born 1999) pro. footballer, plays as a defender for Premier League side Bournemouth

== Died in Bournemouth ==
- Asia Booth Clarke (1835-1888) US born author and wife of actor John Sleeper Clarke, daughter of famous actor Junius Brutus Booth and sister of John Wilkes Booth, actor and assassin of President Abraham Lincoln.
- John Keble (1792–1866) Anglican priest and poet, lead the Oxford Movement at Keble College.
- Solomon Caesar Malan (1812–1894), a British divine, polyglot and well known orientalist.
- Lady Georgiana Fullerton (1812–1885), an English novelist, philanthropist and biographer.
- John Howson (1816–1885), a British divine from Giggleswick-on-Craven.
- Sir John Fowler, 1st Baronet (1817–1898), civil engineer, built railways and railway infrastructure.
- Hugh Cairns, 1st Earl Cairns (1819–1885), statesman, Lord Chancellor under Benjamin Disraeli.
- Andrew Kennedy Hutchison Boyd (1825–1899), Scottish author and divine.
- J. B. Lightfoot (1828–1889), an English theologian and Bishop of Durham.
- Edith Tolkien (1889–1971), wife of the novelist J. R. R. Tolkien.
