= Georg Hanstedt =

German violinist (1904–1975)

- Born: 9 October 1904; Gelsenkirchen
- Died: 25 March 1975 (aged 70); Leipzig
- Occupation: Classical violinist
- Organizations: Gewandhaus Orchestra; Orchestra of the Bayreuth Festival; Schuster Quartet
- Awards: Handel Prize

Georg Hanstedt (9 October 1904 – 25 March 1975) was a German violinist. He was a long-standing member of the Gewandhaus Orchestra in Leipzig, and played in various string quartet formations. In 1934, he became a violinist of the Bayreuth Festival orchestra. He made recordings in the 1960s as second violin of the Schuster Quartet.

== Life ==
Hanstedt was born in 1904 in Gelsenkirchen as the son of a police station master, Georg Hanstedt, and his wife Elisabeth, née Wahnes. After the Abitur passed at the secondary school in his home town, he studied violin (with Walther Davisson and Hans Bassermann), teaching theory and composition (with Max Ludwig) at the Leipzig Conservatory from 1923 to 1928. In addition, he was enrolled at the University of Leipzig in humanities subjects. He had participated in the Gewandhaus concerts already as a student.

In 1929, he became a member of the second violins of the Gewandhaus Orchestra, conducted by Bruno Walter. Following the emergency decree of Reich Chancellor Heinrich Brüning, he was dismissed in November 1931. From October 1934, he played in the Leipziger Sinfonie-Orchester conducted by Hans Weisbach. The same year, he was accepted by the Bayreuth Festival orchestra. In April 1937, he was reinstated in the Gewandhaus Orchestra, which was meanwhile conducted by Hermann Abendroth. He was drafted to the Wehrmacht in February 1943. Until his release in Fürstenwalde in August 1945, he was a prisoner of war in the Soviet Union. He then continued his activities in the Gewandhaus Orchestra with conductors Herbert Albert, Franz Konwitschny, Václav Neumann and Kurt Masur until 1971, eventually playing first violin.

== Chamber music ==
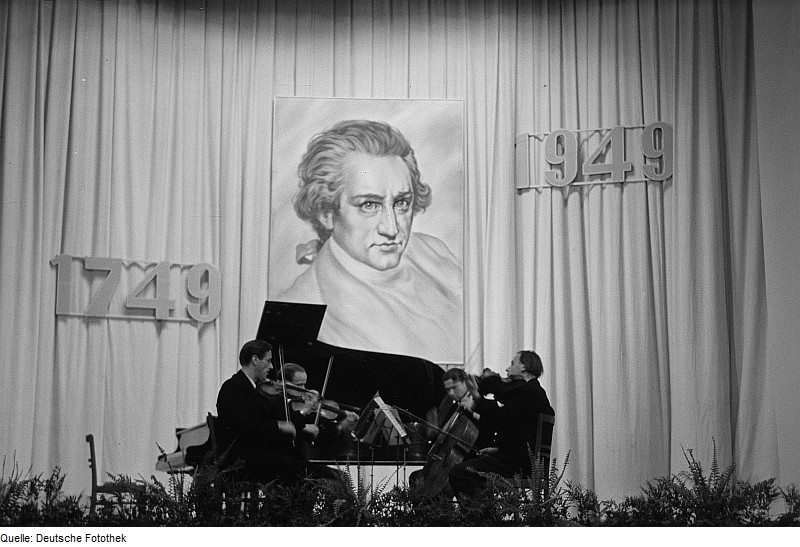
Hanstedt as second violinist of the Kirmse Quartet (1949)

Hanstedt was active as a chamber musician in many ways: From 1928 to 1938 he played second violin in the Genzel Quartet,. and in 1943 in the Schachtebeck Quartet, and from 1945 in the Kirmse Quartet. Later, Hanstedt was second violin of the Schuster Quartet. In 1960, they recorded Max Butting's String Quartet No. 8, Op. 96. They recorded in 1965/66 the String Quartet No. 2 by Leo Spies. The quartet was awarded the Handel Prize in 1963.

From 1936 he was married to Irene Melzer; the couple had two children. He died in Leipzig at age 70.
