= Kirmse =

Kirmse is a surname of German origin. Notable people with the surname include:

- Andrew Kirmse, American computer programmer
- Fritz Kirmse (1912 - ?), German violinist
- Marguerite Kirmse (1885 - 1954), British-American artist
- Mike Kirmse (born 1972), American soccer player
- Persis Kirmse (1884 - 1955), British artist and illustrator
