= Hans Neumeyer =

German teacher, pianist and composer (1887-1944)

Hans Neumeyer (13 September 1887 – 19 May 1944) was a German teacher of musical theory, counterpoint and composition, and a pianist and composer. He was from a Jewish family in Munich; his father Nathan Neumeyer for a period owned a gentleman’s clothing store in Munich. Hans Neumeyer suffered from an eye complaint as a child, leaving him blind in one eye, then at the age of 11 lost the sight of the other eye after a scuffle at school with a fellow pupil.

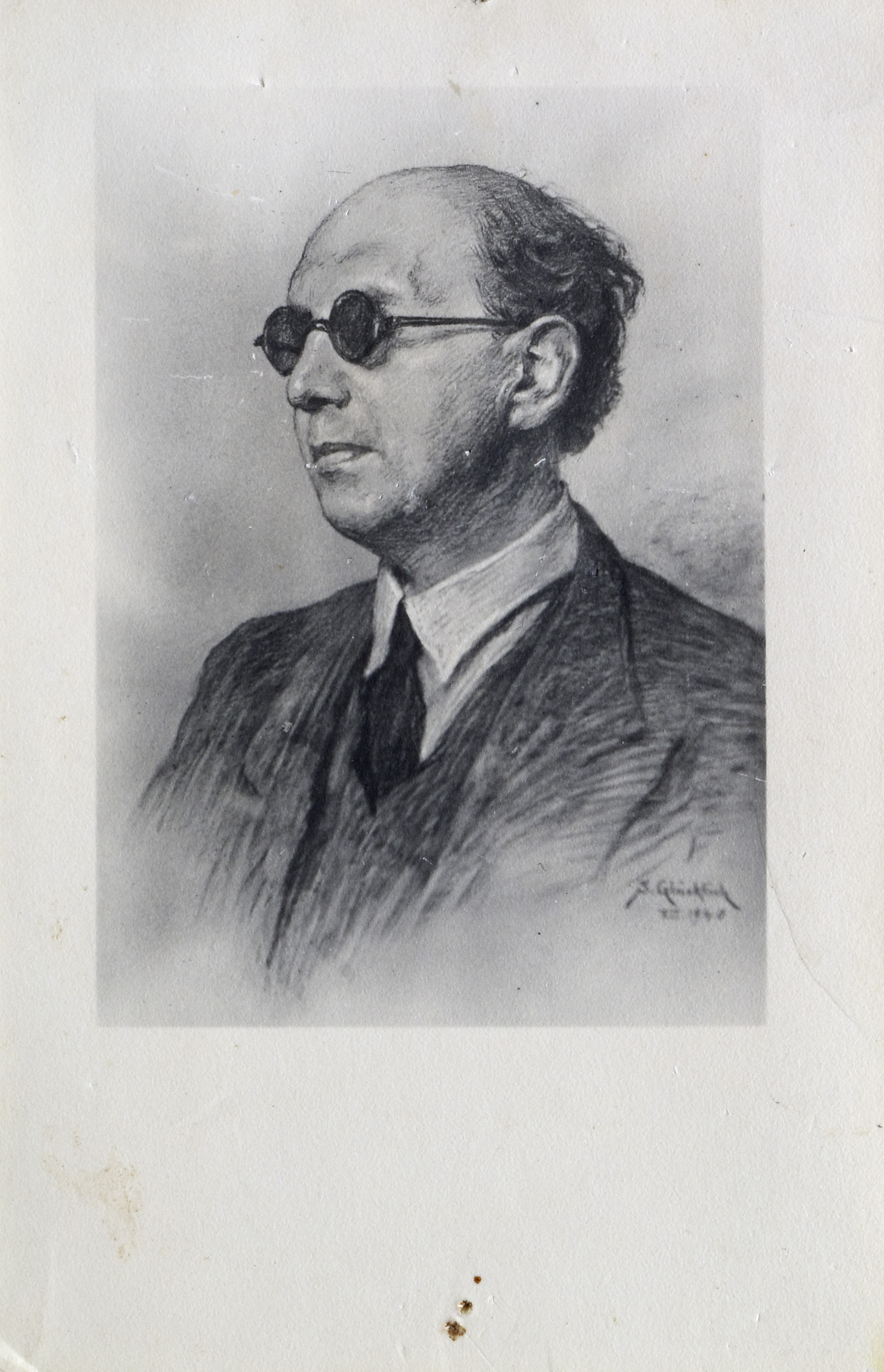
Hans Neumeyer, from a drawing (artist unknown) around 1920-1930

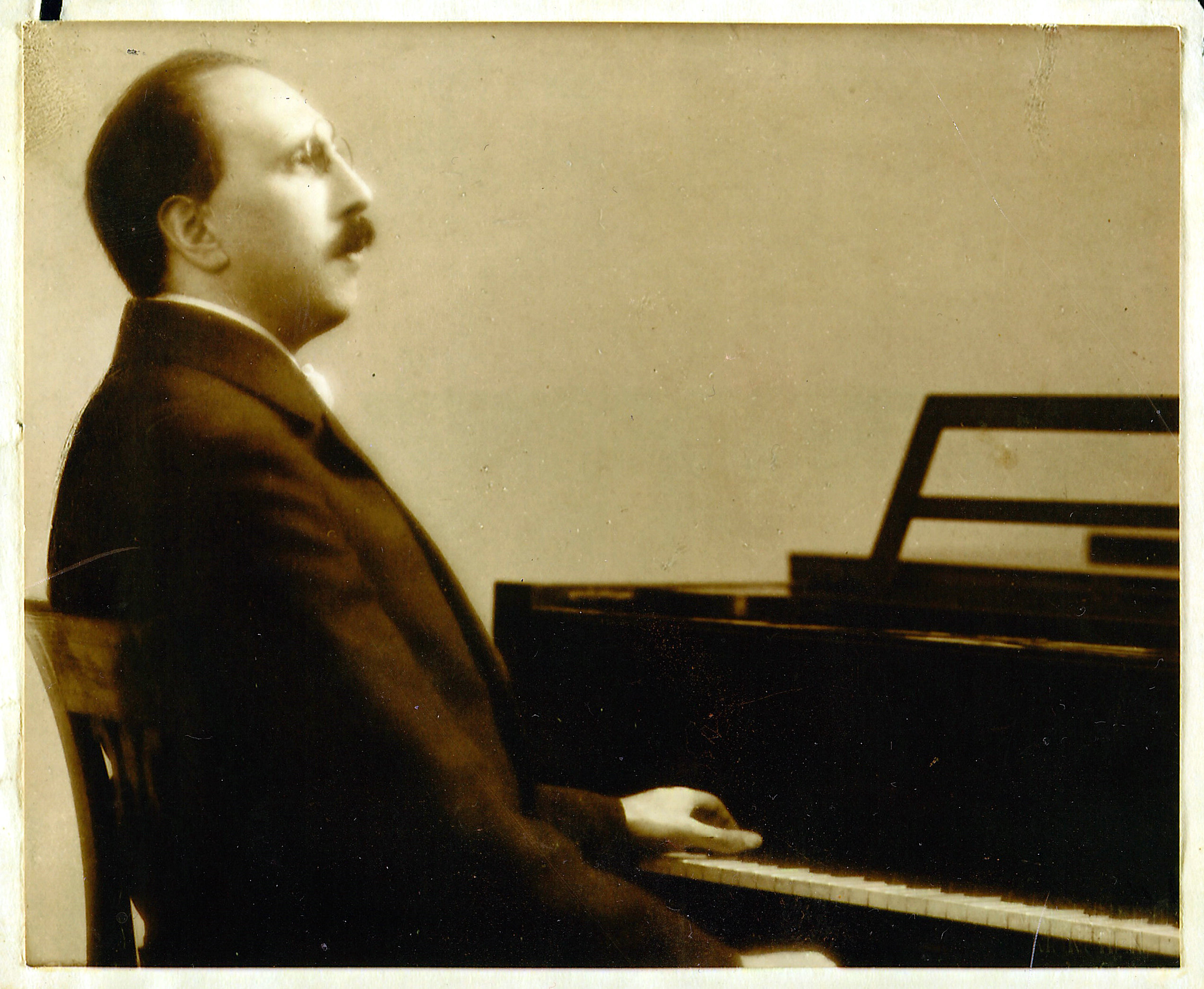
Hans Neumeyer at his piano, around 1920-1930

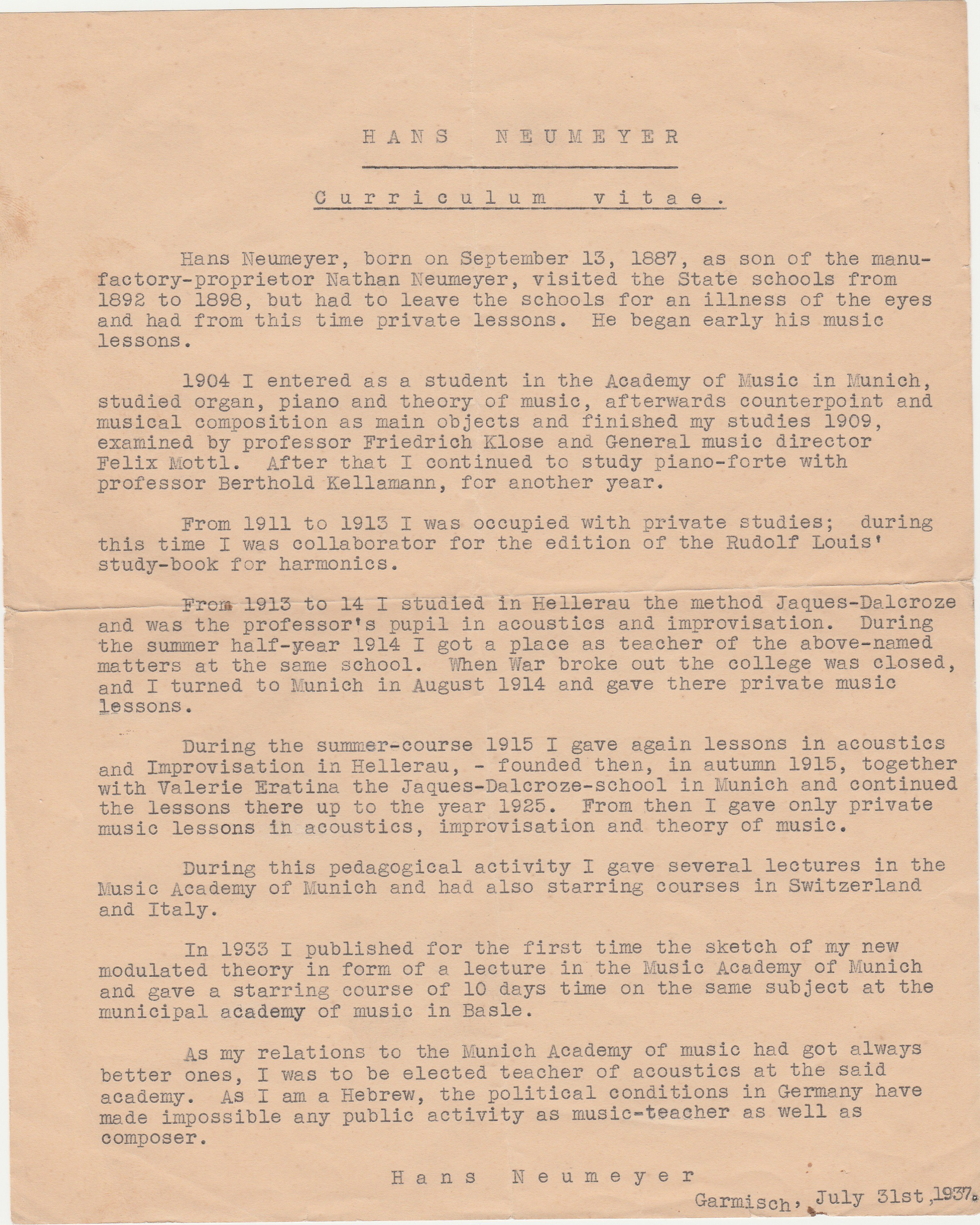
Hans Neumeyer's curriculum vitae, 31 July 1937, four years after the Nazis banned him from taking up a full-time post at the Munich Conservatoire. He records here being taught by Friedrich Klose and Felix Mottl when a student.

He completed his studies at the Academy of Music in Munich in 1909, being examined by Friedrich Klose and Felix Mottl. From 1911 to 1913 he collaborated with Rudolf Louis on a textbook on harmony before studying in the eurythmics centre in Festspielhaus Hellerau where he met his future wife, Vera Ephraim. In 1915 he set up the Jaques-Dalcroze school in Munich with Valeria Kratina, which they ran until 1925. Hans and Vera married in 1920 and moved into a house in the artistic quarter of Dachau, where they had two children, Ruth (1923-2012) and Raimund (1924-2011). Neumeyer’s pupils included the Waldorf educationalist Konrad Sandkühler, who participated in orchestra rehearsals held at Neumeyer’s house, and the composer Siegfried Kuhn.

== Persecution under the Nazis ==
Around the time when the Nazis came to power in 1933 Neumeyer published his ‘new modulated theory’ and was shortlisted for a post lecturing in acoustics at the Academy of Music in Munich, but was prevented from taking up the post or teaching in any public institution because of his Jewish background. In 1935, during a period in which it was becoming increasingly difficult for him to find work, he obtained the following reference in English from Émile Jaques-Dalcroze, then based in Geneva:
“I have had the opportunity of following the work of Mr Hans Neumeyer who studied my method during several years in Hellerau, under my direction. I want to affirm that he is of very great musical and pedagogical qualities, that he is extraordinarily qualified to teach ‘solfège’ (development of the tonal instinct and the harmonic-one as well as of the faculty of hearing) and improvisation at the piano. He is really quite the person to play on the piano during the rhythmic-lessons.”
On 8 November 1938, the day before Kristallnacht, Neumeyer was away in Berlin learning to make flutes, when his wife and children received a visit at home in Dachau from Nazi officials ordering them to leave their house before dawn or else face imprisonment, so that the town could announce itself ‘Judenfrei’ (‘free of Jews’).
His children Ruth and Raimund escaped to England on a Kindertransport, 9 May 1939. He was deported to the Theresienstadt (Terezin) ghetto on 4 June 1942 on a transport containing sick people. Vera Neumeyer was deported on 13 July 1942 to an unknown destination, possibly Auschwitz.

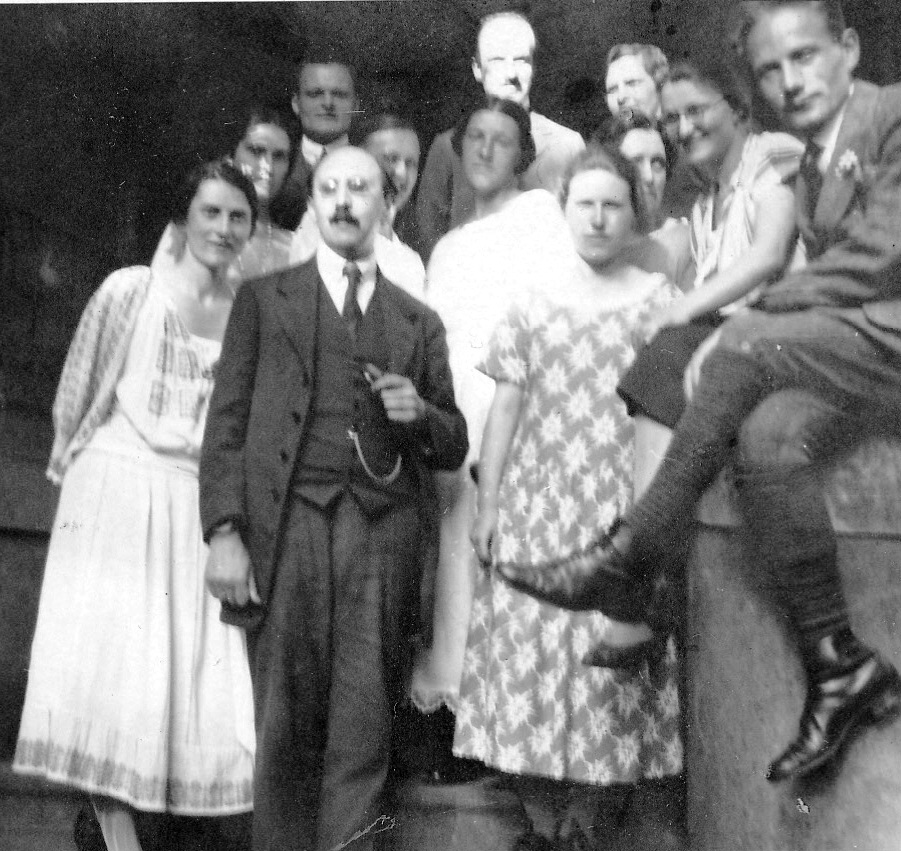
Hans Neumeyer and his pupils, around 1930

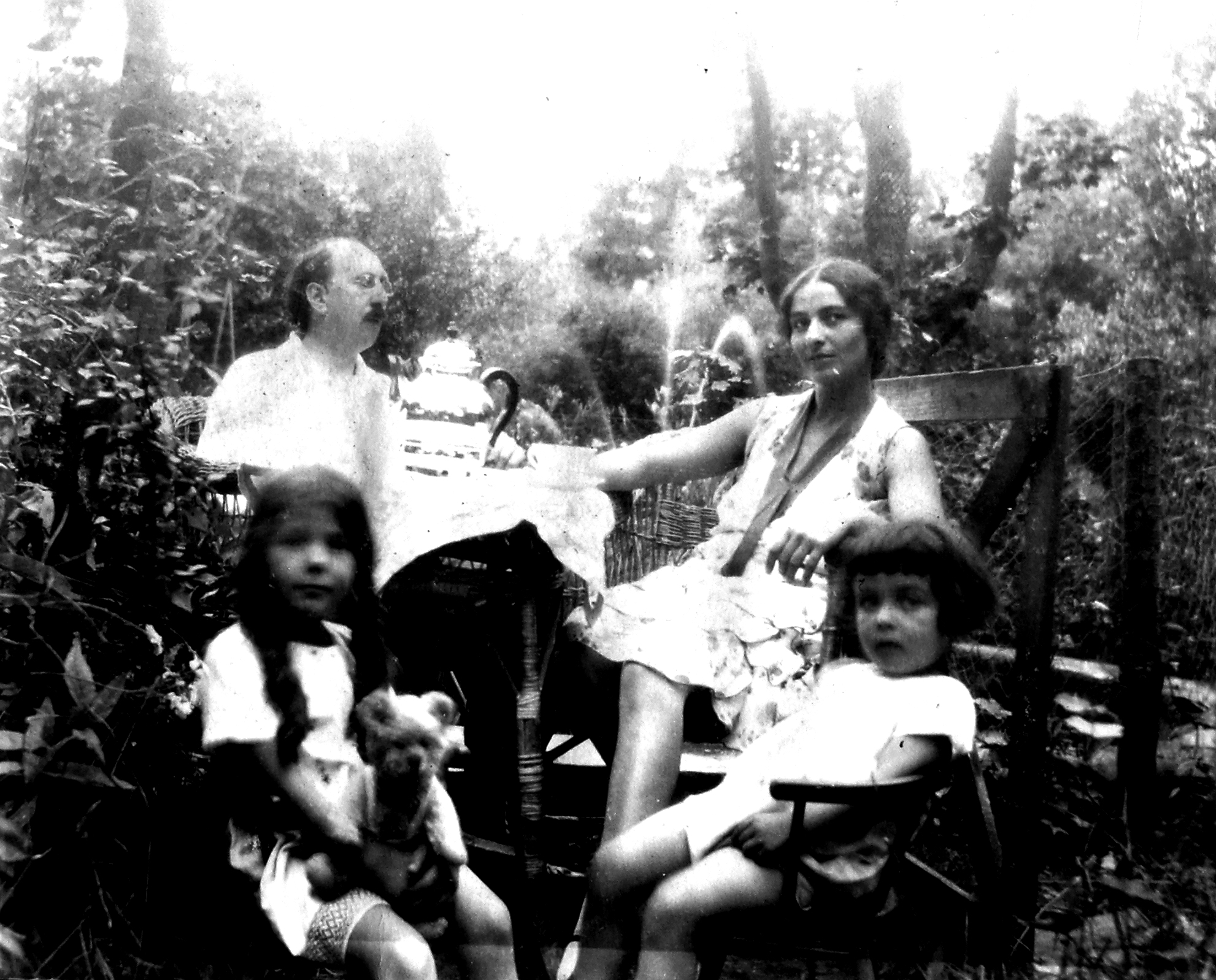
The Neumeyers in their garden in Dachau (Hindenburgstrasse 10; now Hermann-Stockmannstrasse 10) around 1928

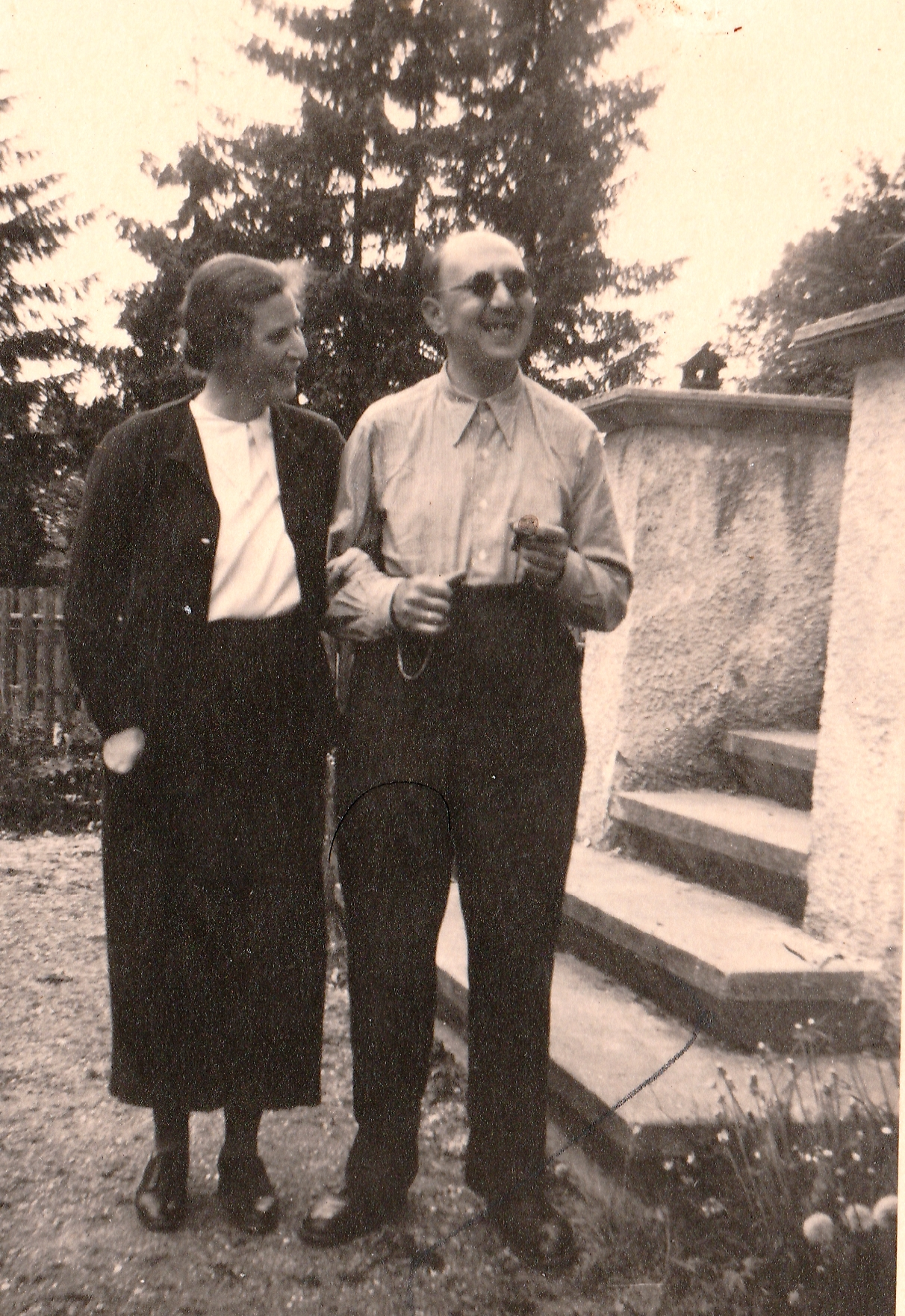
Hans Neumeyer with his secretary and close friend Dela Blakmar, 1930. Photographed at the house of Hans' sister Betty Braun, in Garmisch, Bavaria.

While incarcerated in Theresienstadt, Neumeyer met the 16-year-old Czech violinist Thomas Mandl who was also imprisoned there but survived. In an interview with Hans Holzhaider, Mandl described finding Neumeyer when delivering food along with his teenage friend Hans Ries to the sick and disabled. Ries was whistling a Bach fugue while visiting the ghetto’s home for the blind. Neumeyer noticed him, and soon he was giving the young men music lessons in exchange for soup or bread. Perhaps as a result of this, Neumeyer survived two years in Theresienstadt until his death on 19 May 1944 from a lung disease he had suffered since 1943, thought to have been tuberculosis brought on by the poor living conditions.
Mandl remarked that Neumeyer’s teaching was methodical and well targeted, covering four-part and eight-part harmony, and rhythmic exercises, and taught harmony and counterpoint together rather than as separate disciplines as was normal for that time. Mandl said that Neumeyer gave the impression of a sharp wit and intelligence, and was a very good listener, asking questions that were short and to the point. Mandl sometimes glimpsed the strain on his face when he saw his teacher trying to read in crowded conditions before he registered his pupil’s arrival – but then he would always smile, put down his braille book and give him his delicate, sensitive hand.
Gradually Mandl understood that behind his smiling tolerance was a great mental toughness – both were complementary elements in a harmonious personality. Neumeyer was nicknamed The Professor by his pupils in Theresienstadt, some of whom saw his coffin placed among others on a truck, which they followed to the barrier on the edge of the ghetto. The barrier came down: “that was the way our dead left us” commented Mandl.

== Commemorations ==
Stolpersteine to Hans and Vera Neumeyer, and to their lodger and friend Julius Kohn, were installed outside their house in Dachau in November 2005, commemorating their deaths in the Holocaust.
In November 2018, Neumeyer’s grandsons Tim and Stephen Locke were invited to Dachau to speak at the town hall about the Neumeyers’ lives, when some of Neumeyer’s music was performed.
Neumeyer Weg in Dachau is a street named after Hans and Vera Neumeyer, to commemorate their persecution at the hands of the Nazis.
Neumeyer's daughter Ruth (as Ruth Locke) recorded the story of her family before and during the Holocaust and arrival in England in May 1939, in an interview with the Imperial War Museum in 2005.
Neumeyer's grandson, Tim Locke, writes a blog about the family's story during the 20th century, including through the Holocaust, under the title The Ephraims and the Neumeyers.

== Compositions ==
Neumeyer’s secretary and close friend Dela Blakmar wrote in a letter that virtually all of Neumeyer’s compositions were burnt in bombing in Berlin. However a few items survive.
The only known surviving compositions of Hans Neumeyer are:
String trio in A minor (1939–40): 1 Serioso 2 Allegro moderato 3 Tranquillo cantabile 4 Allegro
D-B-S-G duo in B flat for violin and viola (August 1940): 1 Allegretto 2 Andante moderato 3 Vivace
Two duets for recorder – Kuckucks-Duett für Ruthi and Kanon in der Prime, sent to his daughter Ruth in England in Easter 1940. The manuscript, with its cover picture drawn by Vera Neumeyer of Ruth and her friend Jane playing the recorder in a hammock between two fruit trees, is now on display in the Imperial War Museum, London.
Weihnachtslied (Christmas song) – voice part only, written late 1939 as a Christmas present for his son Raimund.
