= Ludwig Schuster Quartet =

German string quartet

The Ludwig Schuster Quartet was a string quartet from Halle (Saale) active in the 1950s and 1960s. It was named after first violin Ludwig Schuster (concertmaster at the Landestheater Halle).

== Members ==
Members of the ensemble were Ludwig Schuster (1st violin), Adam Busch and Georg Hanstedt (2nd violin), Walter Ziegler (viola) and Otto Kleist (cello).

== History ==
According to Konstanze Musketa "it played a pioneering role in the field of Neue Musik". Thus it premiered several pieces, among others the String Quartet No. 8 "Die Nachgeburt" by Max Butting (1958), the String Quartet No. 1 by Gerhard Wohlgemuth (1960), the 2nd string quartet "Mors et Vita" by Jón Leifs (1960), the String Quartet No. 2 by Leo Spies (1964) and the String Quartet in E major by Hans Stieber (1965).

In Halle (Saale) it performed regularly as part of the Händel Festival. and the Musiktage In 1956 it played at the 2nd All-German Music Festival in Coburg, Franconia, organized by the Verband der Komponisten und Musikwissenschaftler der DDR and by the Deutscher Tonkünstlerverband. In 1957 it gave a guest performance at the Berliner Festtage.

== Awards ==
In 1963 the string quartet was awarded the Handel Prize.

== Discography ==
- Leo Spies: String quartet no. 2 (Eterna 1966)
- Max Butting: String quartet no. 8 (Eterna 1968)
