= Zdenka Faßbender =

Czech-German soprano

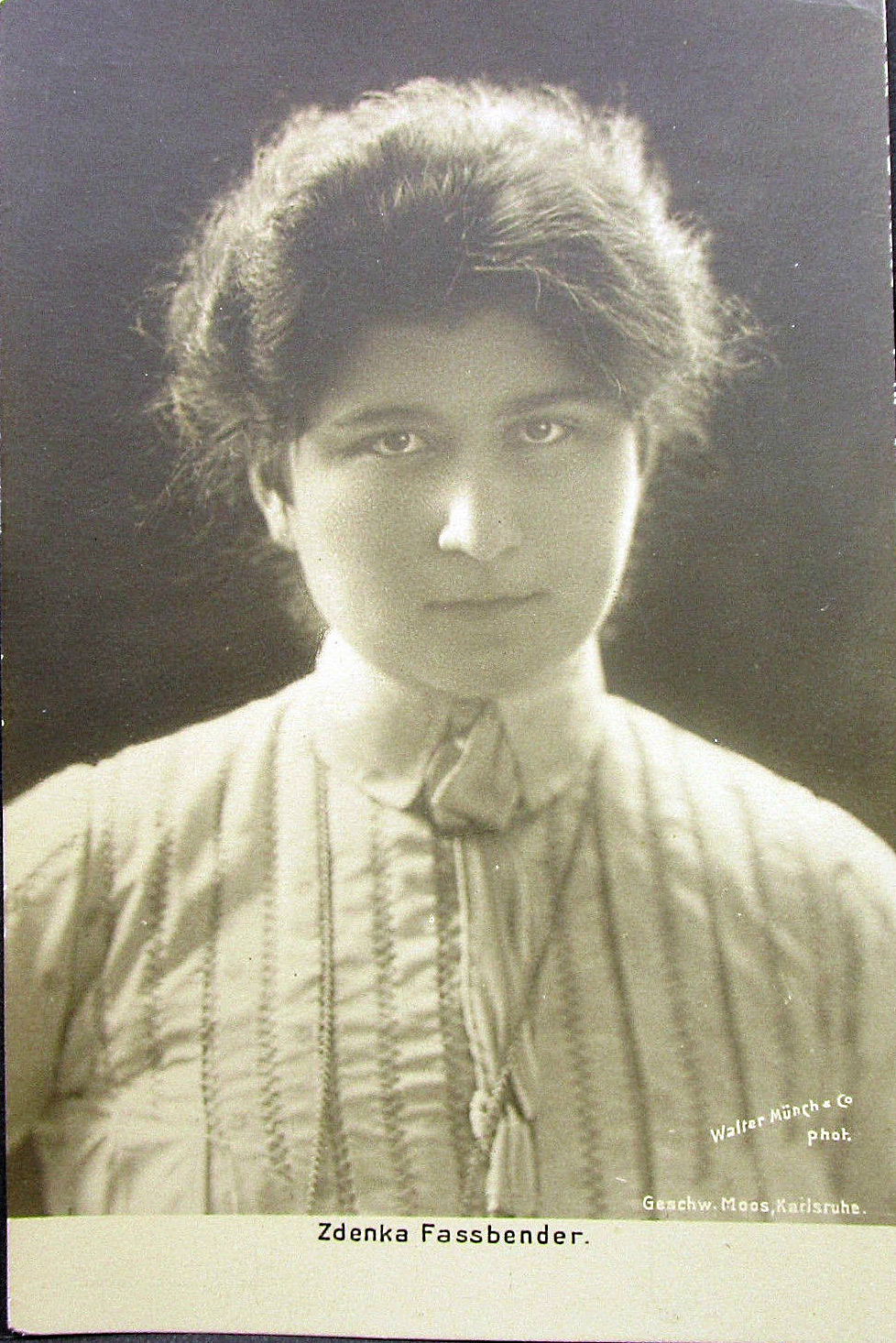
Photo of Zdenka Faßbender

Zdenka Faßbender (also Zdenka Hanfstaengl, Zdenka Anna Fassbenderová; 12 December 1879 – 14 March 1954) was a Czech born German operatic dramatic soprano.

== Life ==
Born in Děčín, Faßbender attended the Prague Conservatory and received training as a stage singer with Sophie Loewe-Destinn. In 1899 she made her debut at the Hoftheater Karlsruhe as Rachel in La Juive by Jacques Fromental Halévy. She soon achieved success as an interpreter of highly dramatic roles.

On 7 June 1903, she took over the title role in the premiere of the opera Ilsebill by Friedrich Klose. In Karlsruhe she met the conductor Felix Mottl. When he was called to the Nationaltheater München in 1904, Faßbender followed him there in 1905.

In Munich she was Mottl's partner, but she married him only in 1911 on his deathbed, because his first wife Henriette Mottl-Standthartner did not agree to a divorce. After his death, she married in 1920 with the art publisher Edgar Hanfstaengl (1883–1958, eldest son of Edgar Hanfstaengl).

At the Munich Court Opera, called Bavarian State Opera since 1918, Faßbender was one of the most distinguished singers for many years. She was particularly regarded as an outstanding Wagner interpreter, as Venus in Tannhäuser, Ortrud in Lohengrin, Isolde in Tristan und Isolde, Brünnhilde in Der Ring des Nibelungen and Kundry in Parsifal. She sang other important roles as Santuzza in Cavalleria rusticana, Iphigenia in Gluck's Iphigenie auf Tauris, Alceste by Gluck, as Valentine in Les Huguenots by Meyerbeer, Dido in Les Troyens by Berlioz, Katharina in Der Widerspänstigen Zähmung by Hermann Goetz, Minneleide in Die Rose vom Liebesgarten by Pfitzner, Gundula in Der Bergsee by Julius Bittner and Leonore in Beethoven's Fidelio.

When Richard Strauss wanted to perform his opera Elektra in Munich in 1909, Faßbender took over the title role at his request. She also appeared in the Munich premieres of the operas Tiefland by Eugen d'Albert (1908, as Martha), Tosca (1909, title role), Der Rosenkavalier (1911, as Marschallin), Der arme Heinrich by Hans Pfitzner (1913, as Hilde) and Mona Lisa by Max von Schillings (1917, title role).

Guest appearances took her to the Wiener Hofoper (1904), to the Staatsoper Unter den Linden (1909) and often to Stuttgart, to the court theatres of Wiesbaden and Mannheim and to the opera house of Cologne. She also took part in the Wagner-Mozart festival from 1907 to 1910. In 1910 and 1913 she sang Elektra and Isolde under the conduct of Sir Thomas Beecham in London and from 1912 to 1914 she sang in the performances of the Ring cycle at the Théâtre de la Monnaie in Brussels.

In 1924, she announced her retirement from the stage. In 1928, she appeared again at the Munich State Opera as Elektra. She was a member of the Staatsoper until 1931. Faßbender died in Munich at the age of 74 and is buried in the old cemetery of Tutzing.
