= Rudolf Louis =

German music critic and conductor

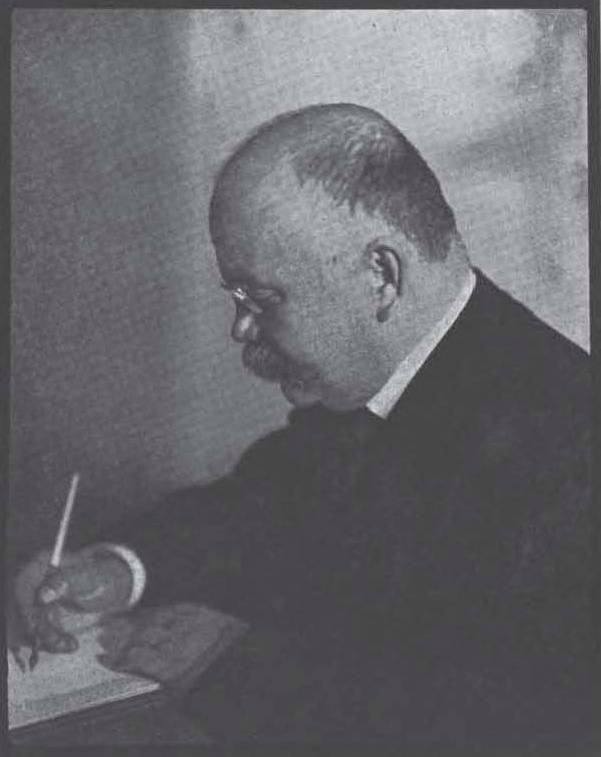
Rudolf Louis (c. 1910)

Johann Rudolf Louis (30 January 1870 – 15 November 1914) was a German music critic and conductor.

== Biography ==
Louis was born in Schwetzingen in 1870. He studied in Geneva, where he was a pupil of Friedrich Klose, and continued his studies in Vienna and then Karlsruhe under Felix Mottl before becoming conductor of the theatre orchestras in Landshut and Lübeck. In 1897, he moved to Munich, where he lived for the remainder of his life. Here he taught harmony and composition. Among his pupils was Wilhelm Petersen.

He was also the music critic for the newspaper Münchner Neueste Nachrichten from 1900 until his death. An advocate of the latest trends in music as exemplified by his friends Ludwig Thuille and Richard Strauss, he published books on Richard Wagner, Franz Liszt, Hector Berlioz, Anton Bruckner, Hans Pfitzner, Klose and contemporary German music. With Ludwig Thuille he wrote an influential manual on harmony, Harmonielehre (1907), which went through many editions.

He had an acrimonious relationship with the composer Max Reger, of whose compositions he usually had negative opinions. After the first performance of Reger's Sinfonietta on 2 February 1906, Louis wrote a typically negative review in the Münchener Neueste Nachrichten on 7 February. Reger wrote to him: Ich sitze in dem kleinsten Zimmer in meinem Hause. Ich habe Ihre Kritik vor mir. Im nächsten Augenblick wird sie hinter mir sein (I am sitting in the smallest room of my house. I have your review before me. In a moment it will be behind me!).

Rudolf Louis died in Munich in 1914, aged 44.
