= Hans Bassermann =

German violinist and music scholar (1888–1978)

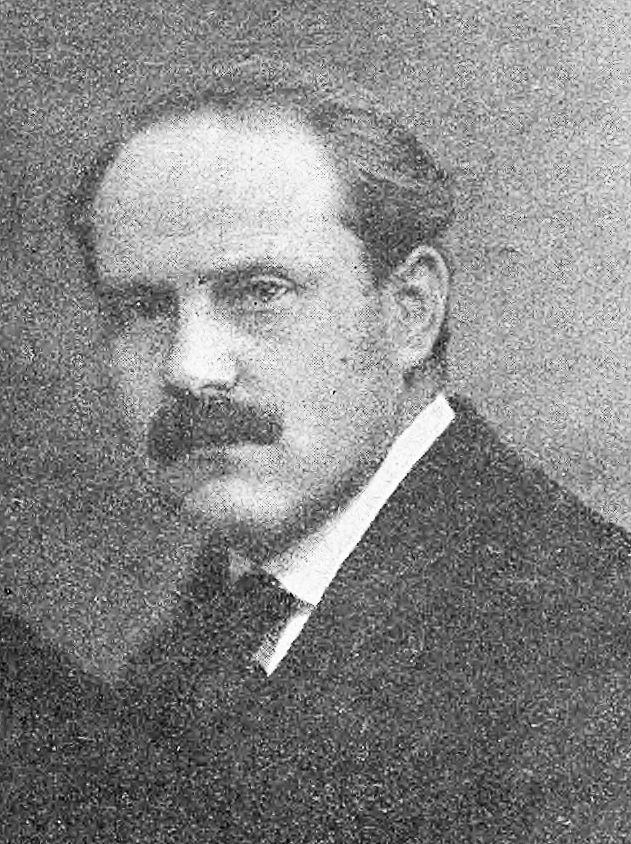
Hans Bassermann (before 1914)

Hans Bassermann (20 September 1888 – 12 February 1978) was a German violinist and music scholar.

== Life ==
Born in Franckfurt, Bassermann was the son of the music teacher Fritz Bassermann (1850-1926), who worked at the Hoch Conservatory in Frankfurt, and the pianist Florence Bassermann, née Rothschild (1863-1922), who was a student of Clara Schumann. He received his first violin lessons from his father and then from Ferdinand Küchler.

After attending the humanistic grammar school and completing his military service in Bad Homburg vor der Höhe, he studied for two years at the Universität der Künste Berlin with Andreas Moser and Henri Marteau, among others, whom he later represented, as well as at the Stern Conservatory in Berlin, with Gustav Hollaender. At the age of 23 he was concertmaster of the Berlin Philharmonic for one year. In 1913 he won a scholarship from the Mendelssohn Scholarship. Bassermann then undertook art tours at home and abroad and took up teaching posts.

He was a soldier in World War I. After the war he resumed his former teaching activities at the Hochschule für Musik, the Sternsche Konservatorium and the Akademie für Kirchen- und Schulmusik. In addition, he was head of a training class at the Klindworth-Scharwenka Conservatory, Berlin.

In 1928 he succeeded Henri Marteau at the Leipzig Conservatory and in 1930 he became a lecturer at the Musikhochschule in Weimar, where, being Jewish, he was dismissed in 1933. Before emigrating to the USA via Switzerland and Palestine in 1938, he was concertmaster in the orchestra of the Kulturbund Deutscher Juden. In Switzerland he played as concertmaster in the Orchestre de la Suisse Romande under Ernest Ansermet in 1937.

In the USA he played as violinist in the Pittsburgh Symphony Orchestra from 1938 to 1944 and as assistant concertmaster in the Chicago Symphony Orchestra from 1944 to 1952. He was first violin teacher at Chicago Musical College. In 1952 he was appointed professor for violin at a university in Lakeland, Florida. From 1958 to 1960 he was concertmaster of the Oakland Symphony Orchestra.

Among his students were among others Arthur Bohnhardt, Georg Hanstedt and Franz Konwitschny.

Bassermann died in Cincinnati, Ohio, aged 89.
