= Natalie Bennett =

Australian-British politician (born 1966)

The Right Honourable The Baroness Bennett of Manor Castle
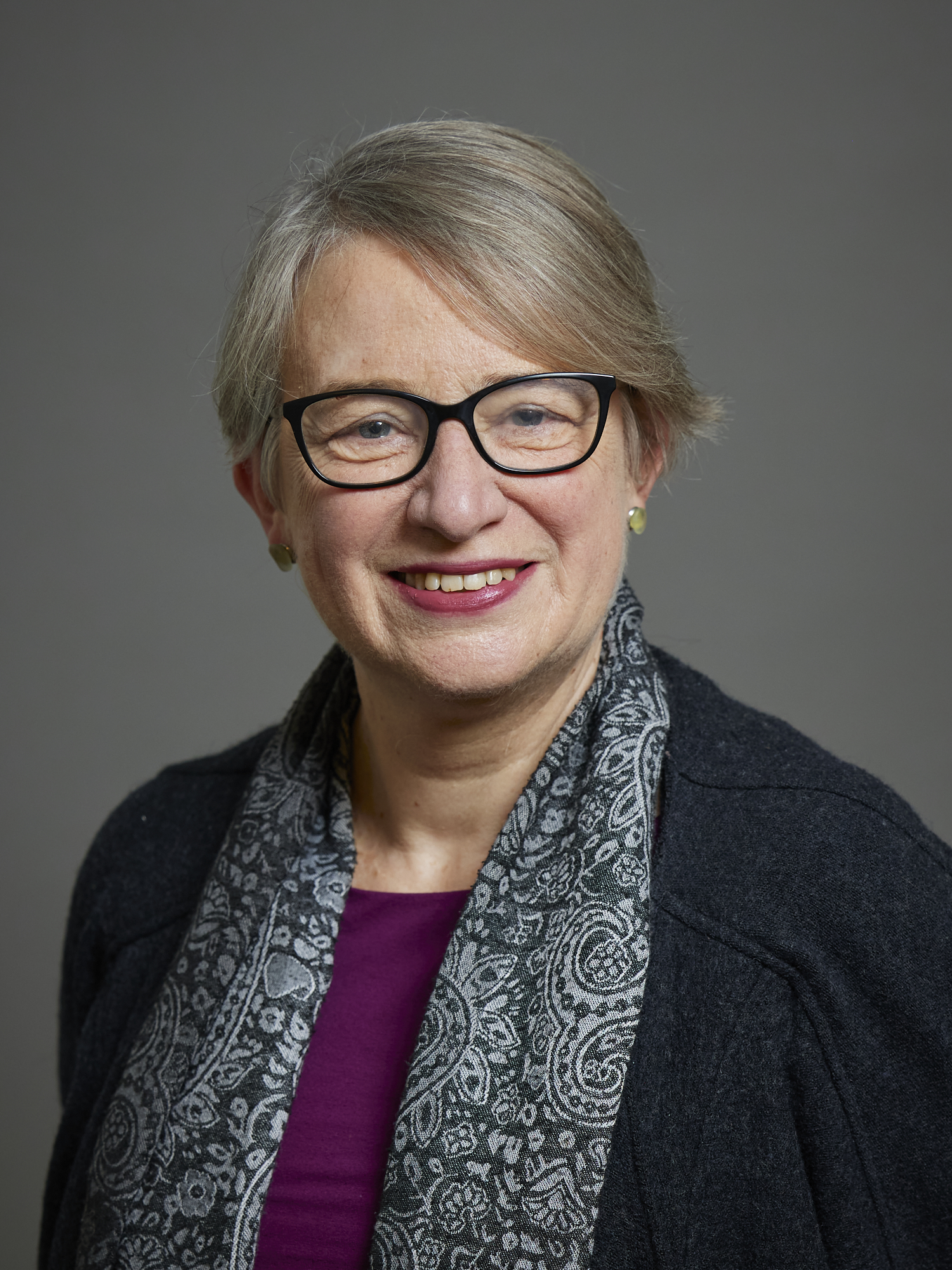
- Official portrait, 2023

Member of the House of Lords
- Lord Temporal
- Life peerage 7 October 2019

Leader of the Green Party of England and Wales
- In office 3 September 2012 – 2 September 2016
- Deputy: Will Duckworth (2012–2014); Amelia Womack and Shahrar Ali (2014–2016)
- Preceded by: Caroline Lucas
- Succeeded by: Jonathan Bartley and Caroline Lucas

Personal details
- Born: Natalie Louise Bennett; 10 February 1966 (age 60) Eastwood, New South Wales, Australia
- Party: Green Party of England and Wales
- Education: University of Sydney (BAgr); University of New England (BA); University of Leicester (MA)
- Website: https://nataliebennett.org/

Natalie Louise Bennett, Baroness Bennett of Manor Castle (born 10 February 1966), is an Australian-British politician and journalist who was the leader of the Green Party of England and Wales from 2012 to 2016. Bennett was given a peerage in Theresa May's 2019 resignation honours.

Born and raised in Australia, she began her career as a journalist with regional newspapers in New South Wales before leaving in 1995 for Thailand, where she worked for Australian Volunteers International and the Bangkok Post newspaper over the next four years. Since settling in Britain in 1999 she has contributed to The Guardian, The Independent, and The Times. Her election as leader of the Greens came six years after she joined the party in January 2006.

== Early life ==
Bennett was born on 10 February 1966 in Eastwood, a suburb of Sydney, Australia, the daughter of John and Joy Bennett. She was born to working class teenage parents: a part-time secretary and an apprentice carpenter. Her mother was killed in a car crash in 1989.

Having been awarded a scholarship, she was educated at MLC School, an independent day school for girls in Burwood, New South Wales. She then took the degrees of Bachelor of Agricultural Science (BAgrSc Hons) at the University of Sydney, Bachelor of Arts (BA Hons) in Asian Studies at the University of New England and Master of Arts (MA) in Mass Communication from the University of Leicester, graduating from the latter in 2001. She was the first member of her family to attend university.

== Journalism career ==
Bennett began her career in journalism in New South Wales, where she worked for various regional newspapers including the Northern Daily Leader in Tamworth. She left Australia in 1995, and lived for four years in Thailand where she worked for Australian Volunteers International in the Office of the National Commission of Women's Affairs, before moving to the Bangkok Post newspaper, where she was chief foreign sub-editor.

She settled in the United Kingdom in 1999, and said in a 2013 interview for the Australian Inside Story website about the country of her birth: "I can’t imagine going there by choice." In Britain, Bennett has written for The Guardian's "Comment is Free" section since 2006. Bennett was also a blogger. She was deputy editor and then editor of The Guardian Weekly from December 2007 until March 2012. She has also worked for the London-based Independent and Times newspapers. In 2012, she took voluntary redundancy and left journalism.

== Political career ==
Natalie Bennett joined the Green Party on 1 January 2006. Later the same year she stood for the Greens in the Camden Council election in the Regent's Park ward and again in the Camden Council election of 2010 in the Somers Town ward, but was not elected on either occasion. She was the internal communications coordinator on the national executive of the party from September 2007 to August 2011.

In January 2010, she was selected to stand for the Parliamentary seat of Holborn and St Pancras. She came fourth with 2.7% of the vote. She stood next in the London Assembly elections of 2012, as the fourth placed candidate on the London-wide list for the Green Party.

=== Green Party leader (2012–2016) ===
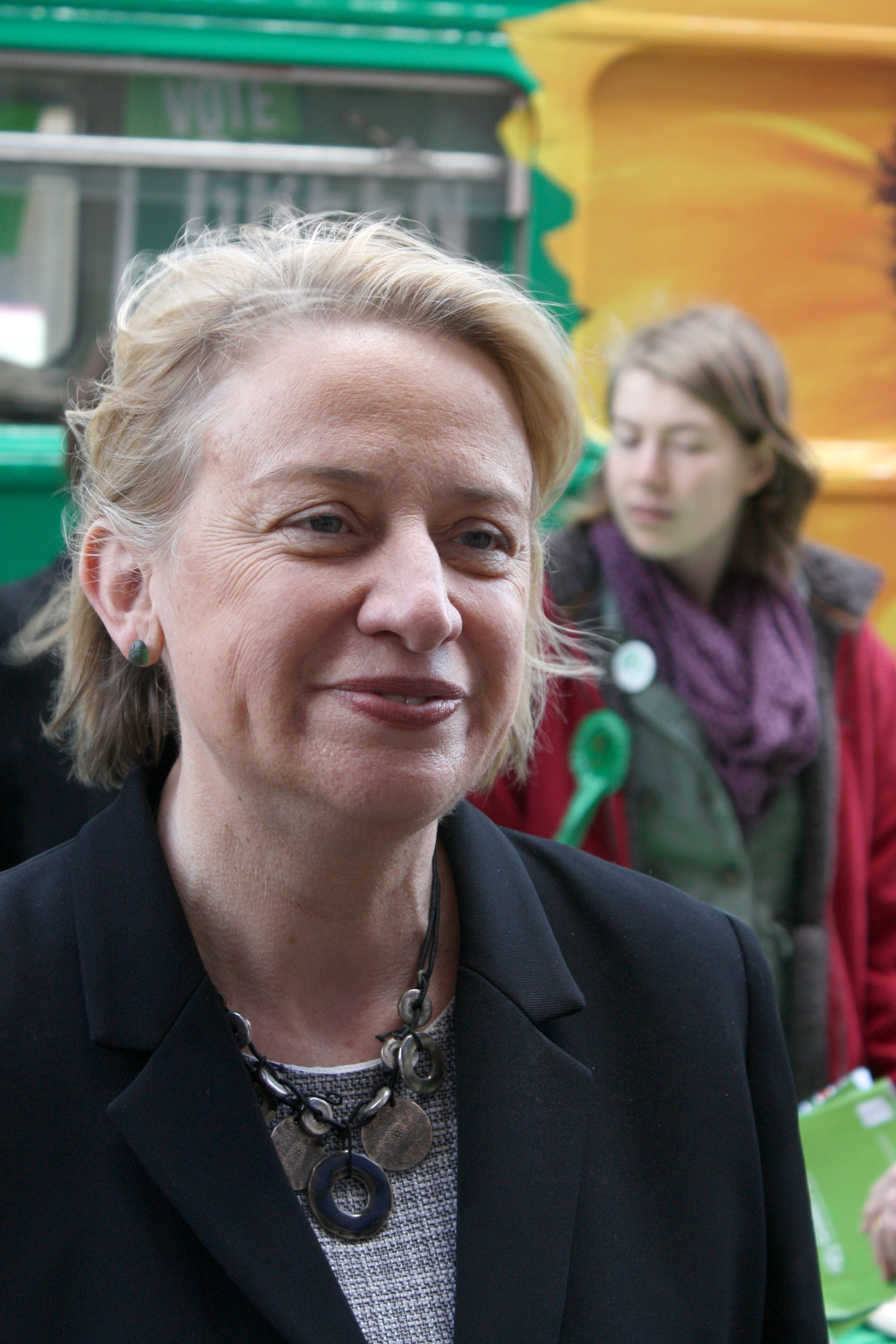
Bennett campaigning in Cambridge during the general election of 2015.

On 3 September 2012, Bennett replaced Caroline Lucas as leader of the Green Party of England and Wales. 3,127 ballot papers were returned in the 2012 Green Party leadership elections, a turnout of 25.1%. This turnout was explained by Bennett in a BBC interview: "if you hold an election in the month of August you kind of expect that turnout won't be particularly high". On election as party leader Bennett told a press conference that the policies of the Green Party were "the only viable way forward for British people, for the world".

Under Bennett's leadership, the party moved to position itself as a left-wing alternative to the Labour Party, putting emphasis on social justice as well as the environment, and adopting such policies as renationalising the railways, making the minimum wage the same as the living wage, a wealth tax on the top 1%, and building more affordable housing.

At the 2014 European elections, the Green Party finished fourth, above the Liberal Democrats, winning more than 1.2 million votes. The party also increased its European Parliament representation, gaining one seat in the South West England region.

She was re-elected unopposed as leader of the party in September 2014.

In the runup to the 2015 general election the party experienced what was described as a "Green Surge", as membership of the party increased from less than 20,000 to over 60,000 between October 2014 and May 2015. They also saw their polling improve; one opinion poll in January 2015 put the Greens on 11%, ahead of the Liberal Democrats.

In February 2015, Bennett gave an interview regarding the funding of house-building on the talk radio station LBC, which she later described as "absolutely excruciating". In the interview, she struggled to explain how her party would pay for 500,000 new council homes it pledged to build. She told Nick Ferrari the policy would cost £2.7bn, prompting the presenter to ask: “Five hundred thousand homes – £2.7bn? What are they made of – plywood?” She later put this down to a "brain fade".

In January 2015 Ofcom ruled to exclude the Green Party from the televised debates surrounding the 2015 election, on the grounds that the party had not demonstrated "significant past electoral support in General Elections". The Green Party said it was "deeply disappointed" by the ruling, and David Cameron claimed that he was "quite happy for there to be no debates at all" if the Green Party was not included. In the event, the publicity generated by this helped the Greens, and nearly 300,000 people signed a petition to have them included in the debates, and their membership and poll ratings continued to increase. The decision was later reversed, after which the Green Party's support increased again. The seven-way debate ultimately took place on 2 April, with Bennett present.

The Green Party greatly increased its vote in the 2015 election, winning 1.1 million votes, with 3.8% of the national vote, a fourfold increase on their performance in 2010. However the party still returned only one MP, Caroline Lucas.

In May 2014 she had been selected again to contest the Parliamentary seat of Holborn and St Pancras. Bennett came third in the election to the Labour and Conservative candidates (future prime minister Keir Starmer held the seat for Labour), and in 2016, at the end of her second two-year term, did not stand for re-election as leader. She was succeeded as leader by Lucas and Jonathan Bartley.

=== 2017 UK general election ===
On 7 October 2016, it was announced that Bennett had been selected to contest the Sheffield Central constituency for the Green Party in the 2017 general election. Bennett's candidacy saw a drop of 7.8% in the share of Green votes as well as a drop in its position from second to third (out of eight candidates) with 3,848 votes.

=== House of Lords ===
Bennett was nominated for a life peerage in September 2019. On 7 October 2019, she was created Baroness Bennett of Manor Castle, of Camden in the London Borough of Camden. She becomes the Green Party of England and Wales' second current member of the unelected House of Lords, joining Jenny Jones, Baroness Jones of Moulsecoomb. She was introduced to the Lords on 15 October 2019 by Baroness Jones of Moulsecoomb and John Bird, Baron Bird, and made her maiden speech on 17 October 2019.

In 2022, Bennett tabled amendments to the Building Safety Bill based on the proposed Zane's Law, seeking stronger protections for people living on or near contaminated land. She has continued to support the campaign in the House of Lords.

== Electoral performance ==
=== Local Government ===
2006 Camden London Borough Council election: Regent's Park (3)
| Party | Candidate | Votes | % | ±% |
|---|---|---|---|---|
| Labour | Nasim Ali * | 1,329 | 42.4 | −6.0 |
| Labour | Theo Blackwell * | 1,204 | 38.4 | −7.1 |
| Labour | Heather Johnson * | 1,172 | 37.4 | −7.3 |
| Conservative | Michele Potel | 814 | 26.0 | −2.4 |
| Conservative | James Morris | 804 | 25.6 | −1.6 |
| Conservative | John Iredale | 792 | 25.3 | −0.7 |
| Green | Natalie Bennett | 616 | 19.6 | −4.7 |
| Liberal Democrats | Anne Brown | 586 | 18.7 | +4.1 |
| Green | Stephen Plowden | 463 | 14.8 | −8.0 |
| Green | Joel Derbyshire | 434 | 13.8 | −5.6 |
| Liberal Democrats | Lawrence Nicholson | 424 | 13.5 | +2.7 |
| Liberal Democrats | Richard Waddington | 330 | 10.5 | −0.3 |
| Turnout | | 8,968 | 36.8 | |
| Labour hold | | Swing | | |
| Labour hold | | Swing | | |
| Labour hold | | Swing | | |

2010 Camden London Borough Council election: St Pancras and Somers Town (3)
| Party | Candidate | Votes | % | ±% |
|---|---|---|---|---|
| Labour | Roger Robinson * | 2,744 | 52.9 | +7.8 |
| Labour | Peter Brayshaw | 2,650 | 51.1 | +10.4 |
| Labour | Samata Khatoon | 2,614 | 50.4 | +11.3 |
| Liberal Democrats | Abdus Shaheed | 1,024 | 19.7 | +5.7 |
| Liberal Democrats | Dave Hoefling | 1,011 | 19.5 | +8.8 |
| Liberal Democrats | Frederic Carver | 927 | 17.9 | +7.7 |
| Green | Natalie Bennett | 738 | 14.2 | −2.5 |
| Conservative | Adam Lester | 721 | 13.9 | −0.3 |
| Conservative | Brian Rice | 701 | 13.5 | −0.3 |
| Conservative | Patsy Prince | 688 | 13.3 | −0.3 |
| Green | Matty Mitford | 467 | 9.0 | −2.9 |
| Green | Cathryn Symons | 422 | 8.1 | +1.2 |
| Turnout | | 5,190 | 57.2 | +18.2 |
| Labour hold | | Swing | | |
| Labour hold | | Swing | | |
| Labour hold | | Swing | | |

=== House of Commons ===
General election 2010: Holborn and St Pancras
| Party | Candidate | Votes | % | ±% |
|---|---|---|---|---|
| Labour | Frank Dobson | 25,198 | 46.1 | |
| Liberal Democrats | Jo Shaw | 15,256 | 27.9 | |
| Conservative | George Lee | 11,134 | 20.4 | |
| Green | Natalie Bennett | 1,480 | 2.7 | |
| BNP | Robert Carlyle | 779 | 1.4 | |
| UKIP | Max Spencer | 587 | 1.1 | |
| Independent | John Chapman | 96 | 0.2 | |
| English Democrat | Mikel Susperregi | 75 | 0.1 | |
| Independent | Iain Meek | 44 | 0.1 | |
| Majority | | 9,942 | 17.8 | |
| Turnout | | 54,649 | 62.9 | |
| Registered electors | | 86,563 | | |
| Labour hold | | Swing | | |

General election 2015: Holborn and St Pancras
| Party | Candidate | Votes | % | ±% |
|---|---|---|---|---|
| Labour | Keir Starmer | 29,062 | 52.9 | +6.8 |
| Conservative | Will Blair | 12,014 | 21.9 | +1.5 |
| Green | Natalie Bennett | 7,013 | 12.8 | +10.1 |
| Liberal Democrats | Jill Fraser | 3,555 | 6.5 | −21.4 |
| UKIP | Maxine Spencer | 2,740 | 5.0 | +3.9 |
| CISTA | Shane O'Donnell | 252 | 0.5 | New |
| Animal Welfare | Vanessa Hudson | 173 | 0.3 | New |
| Socialist Equality | David O'Sullivan | 108 | 0.2 | New |
| Majority | | 17,048 | 31.0 | +13.2 |
| Turnout | | 54,917 | 63.3 | +0.4 |
| Registered electors | | 86,764 | | |
| Labour hold | | Swing | +2.6 | |

General election 2017: Sheffield Central
| Party | Candidate | Votes | % | ±% |
|---|---|---|---|---|
| Labour | Paul Blomfield | 33,963 | 70.9 | +15.9 |
| Conservative | Stephanie Roe | 6,215 | 13.0 | +1.9 |
| Green | Natalie Bennett | 3,848 | 8.0 | −7.8 |
| Liberal Democrats | Shaffaq Mohammed | 2,465 | 5.1 | −4.6 |
| UKIP | Dominic Cook | 1,060 | 2.2 | −5.3 |
| Yorkshire | Jack Carrington | 197 | 0.4 | New |
| Pirate | Rob Moran | 91 | 0.2 | −0.1 |
| SDP | Joe Westnidge | 38 | 0.1 | New |
| Majority | | 27,748 | 57.9 | +15.7 |
| Turnout | | 47,877 | 62.0 | +4.6 |
| Labour hold | | Swing | +7.0 | |

== Political positions ==
Bennett has considered herself a feminist since she was a young child, claiming that it was her "first politics". She also founded the Green Party women's group and was a trustee of the Fawcett Society between 2010 and 2014. She became interested in environmental issues when she obtained a degree in Agricultural Sciences. She is in favour of abolishing the monarchy. In an April 2015 interview, she said that she supports the Green Party policy of an economic and cultural boycott of Israel, and also thought that Britain should cease arms sales to Saudi Arabia. She has also voiced support for polygamy and polyamorous relationships.

She opposes HS2, a high-speed railway, arguing that the project is unhealthy socially, bad for the environment, and harmful to local economies.

== Personal life ==
Baroness Bennett is single and lives in Sheffield. During her time as leader, her partner was Jim Jepps, a left-wing activist who was a member of the Socialist Workers Party (SWP) for approximately a decade until 2003.

== Bibliography ==
- Editor, Thailand Country Study: Best Practice Guide on Sustainable Action Against Child Labour (1998) ISBN 974-8369-59-5
- Editor, Women's Health and Development, Country Profile Thailand
- Change Everything: How we can rethink, repair and rebuild society (2024) ISBN 9781800183025

Media offices
| Preceded by Patrick Ensor | Editor of The Guardian Weekly; 2007–2012 | Succeeded by Abby Deveney |
Party political offices
| Preceded by Caroline Lucas | Leader of the Green Party of England and Wales; 2012–2016 | Succeeded by Jonathan Bartley; Caroline Lucas |
