= Patrick Ensor =

British newspaper journalist

Patrick Ensor (2 December 1946 – 1 July 2007) was a British newspaper journalist. He was the editor of Guardian Weekly from 1993 until his death in 2007.

== Early life and career ==
Patrick Ensor was born in December 1946 in Bournemouth. His father, Michael de Normann Ensor, was a civil servant in Gold Coast (now Ghana), whose mother was the theosophical educationist Beatrice Ensor. He was educated at St George's school in Port Elizabeth, South Africa, until he was 10, then at Bryanston School in Dorset. He studied philosophy and economics at the University of Bristol.

Ensor's early journalism posts were at The Yorkshire Post, Oxford Mail, Times Higher Education Supplement, Screen International and the Tower community newspaper. He joined The Guardian in 1974 as a features subeditor and he became the Arts Editor in 1980. He was associate/features editor of the Wellington, New Zealand newspaper The Dominion from 1985 to 1991, where he helped editor Geoff Bayliss "rejuvenate" the paper. While at The Dominion he trained the poet Andrew Johnston as a subeditor. He returned to the UK in 1992 to rejoin The Guardian as a features subeditor before becoming the editor of Guardian Weekly in 1993, in succession to John Perkin. Ensor wrote for the Pacific Journalism Review in 2003, and contributed once a fortnight to Radio New Zealand.

Alan Rusbridger said of Ensor: "He was a punctilious editor of the old school as well as a quick-witted, tireless and kind colleague." Roger Alton said he was "a ferociously sharp journalist, clever, dedicated, hugely industrious - shamingly so to many of his colleagues like me - and hugely creative." Ensor's deputy editor, Natalie Bennett, became editor after he died.

== Personal life ==
Ensor was married to Judith Thomas, an artist and naturopath osteopath. He sang in a choir, swam, and played cricket, football, tennis and golf. He was diagnosed with auto-immune haemolytic anemia in February 2007 and died that July at his holiday home in Provence. He was survived by his wife, author and creator of Portals of Light Meditation Cards, and by his brother Jeremy. His niece, Josie, was the Middle East correspondent for The Daily Telegraph based in Beirut and has won the Marie Colvin Award and an Amnesty International Award. She is now based in New York for The Times. His nephew, Charlie, is currently Senior Media Manager for Action Aid based in London.

Media offices
Preceded by John Perkin	Editor of The Guardian Weekly; 1993–2007	Succeeded by Natalie Bennett
