= Wilhelm Petersen (composer) =

German composer and conductor (1890–1957)

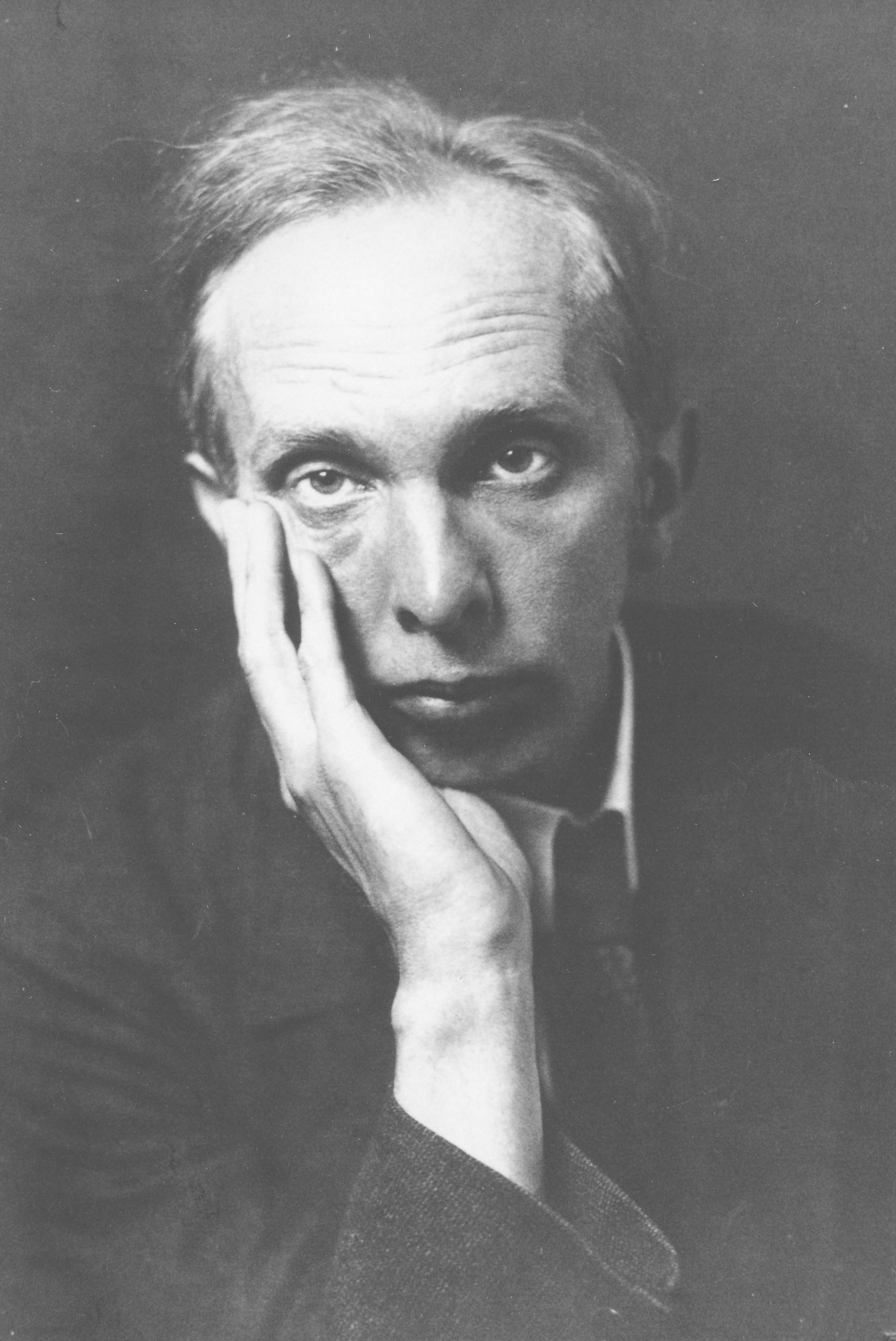
Wilhelm Petersen in the 1930s

Wilhelm Petersen (15 March 1890 – 18 December 1957) was a German composer and conductor. His body of work includes, among other things, five major symphonies, a piano concerto, a violin concerto, an opera Der goldene Topf (premiered in Darmstadt 1941), and a mass, as well as numerous choral and chamber music pieces, along with songs. Petersen's works are stylistically positioned at the vague boundary between late Romanticism and Modernism and are mostly composed in his own distinctive tonal language.

He was born in Athens and spent his childhood in Darmstadt. From 1908 to 1913 he studied at the University of Music and Theatre Munich with Friedrich Klose, Felix Mottl and Rudolf Louis. In addition to music he wrote lyric and dramatic poetry and was on the fringes of the circle around Stefan George. Petersen was an apprentice conductor in Lübeck under Wilhelm Furtwängler in 1913-14; at the end of the First World War he was active as a writer in the Expressionist movement in Munich but from 1919 devoted himself entirely to music. His early music is described as radically Expressionistic, but in the 1920s he progressively clarified his style, arriving at a monumental tonal style typified by his Grosse Messe, op. 27 of 1928-29, premiered in 1930 in Darmstadt under Karl Böhm. From 1927 he was a lecturer in the Music Academy at Darmstadt, and in 1934 became professor of music in Mannheim. He died in Darmstadt.

== Sources ==
Wilhelm-Petersen-Society, Darmstadt (Germany)

- Booklet for Wergo WER 6213-2 (recording of Petersen's Grosse Messe)
