= B. Mansell Ramsey =

English organist

Benjamin Mansell Ramsey (Richmond, Surrey, 10 August 1849 - West Wittering, 31 August 1923) was an English organist and amateur composer, best remembered for the 1919 hymn tune "Camacha", set as "Teach Me Thy Way, O Lord" 1920. A music teacher at Bournemouth Grammar School, and secretary of the Bournemouth Musical Association, conductor of the amateur orchestra in the 1880s and involved with the establishment of Bournemouth Municipal Orchestra in 1893. His works for children included "Robinson Crusoe: A Cantata or Operetta for Boys" (1896) and "Clouds and Sunshine: A Fairy Play". His daughter was the writer L. F. Ramsey.
