= Franz Konwitschny =

German conductor (1901–1962)

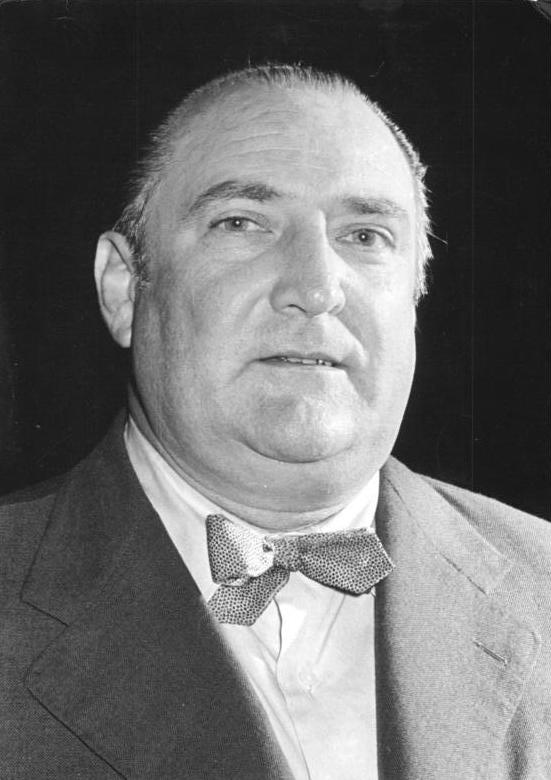
- Konwitschny in 1956
- Born: 14 August 1901; Fulnek, Moravia
- Died: 28 July 1962 (aged 60); Belgrade, Yugoslavia
- Occupations: Conductor; pedagogue

Franz Konwitschny (14 August 1901, Fulnek, Moravia – 28 July 1962, Belgrade) was a German conductor and violist of Moravian descent.

== Biography ==
Konwitschny came from a family of musicians. From 1920 to 1923 he took violin lessons at the Academy of the Music Association in Brno, Czechoslovakia, before becoming a student of Hans Bassermann at the University of Music and Theatre Leipzig from April 1923 to 1925. There, the music teacher Fritz Reuter was one of his teachers. He started his career on the viola, playing in the Leipzig Gewandhaus Orchestra under Wilhelm Furtwängler. In 1925, he moved to Vienna, where he played the viola with the Fitzner Quartet. He also began teaching at the Wiener Volkskonservatorium. He later became a conductor, joining the Stuttgart Opera in 1927.

=== Nazi era career ===
Konwitschny first joined the NSDAP (Nazi Party) on July 1, 1923 in Fulnek (membership number 2,756). His political convictions at the time were also expressed in a performance of Fidelio in Freiburg in 1934, where he wanted to bring SA men and SA flags onto the stage on the occasion of Adolf Hitler's birthday, but this was forbidden by the management. On August 1, 1937, Konwitschny rejoined the NSDAP (membership number 5,508,995). In October of that year he conducted Anton Bruckner's patriotic cantata Germanenzug before Alfred Rosenberg's speech at the closing rally of the 2nd Baden Gau Culture Week, which was held under the motto "Race and Culture". On the other hand, in November of the same year he conducted the opera Matthias the Painter by the ostracized composer Paul Hindemith in a subscription concert. In the next year, his mentor, Bassermann, who was Jewish, fled to the United States.

During the World War II years he was chief conductor in the Frankfurt Opera. In the late war years 1943–1944 he was chief conductor of the orchestra in Ludwigshafen, today the Rhineland-Palatinate State Philharmonic.

=== East German career ===
In 1946 the city of Hanover appointed him as musical director of opera and concerts, a post which he held to 1949. From 1949 until his death he was principal conductor of the Leipzig Gewandhaus Orchestra. From 1953 until 1955 he was also principal conductor of the Dresden Staatskapelle and from 1955 onward he led the Berlin State Opera.

Like Wilhelm Furtwängler, Konwitschny used "expansive gestures" and had a "dislike of an exact beat." Konwitschny recorded a complete cycle of Beethoven symphonies.

He was given the nickname Kon-whisky because of his heavy drinking habits.

His first marriage to Maria Wilhelmine Josephine Hambloch (Gieser) produced two children, Franziska Hinzte (née Konwitschny) and Dieter Konwitschny. His son from his second marriage Peter Konwitschny is a leading opera director in Germany.

Franz Konwitschny died suddenly of a heart attack during a rehearsal while on tour in Yugoslavia. Unusual for musical figures he was given a full state funeral by the GDR.

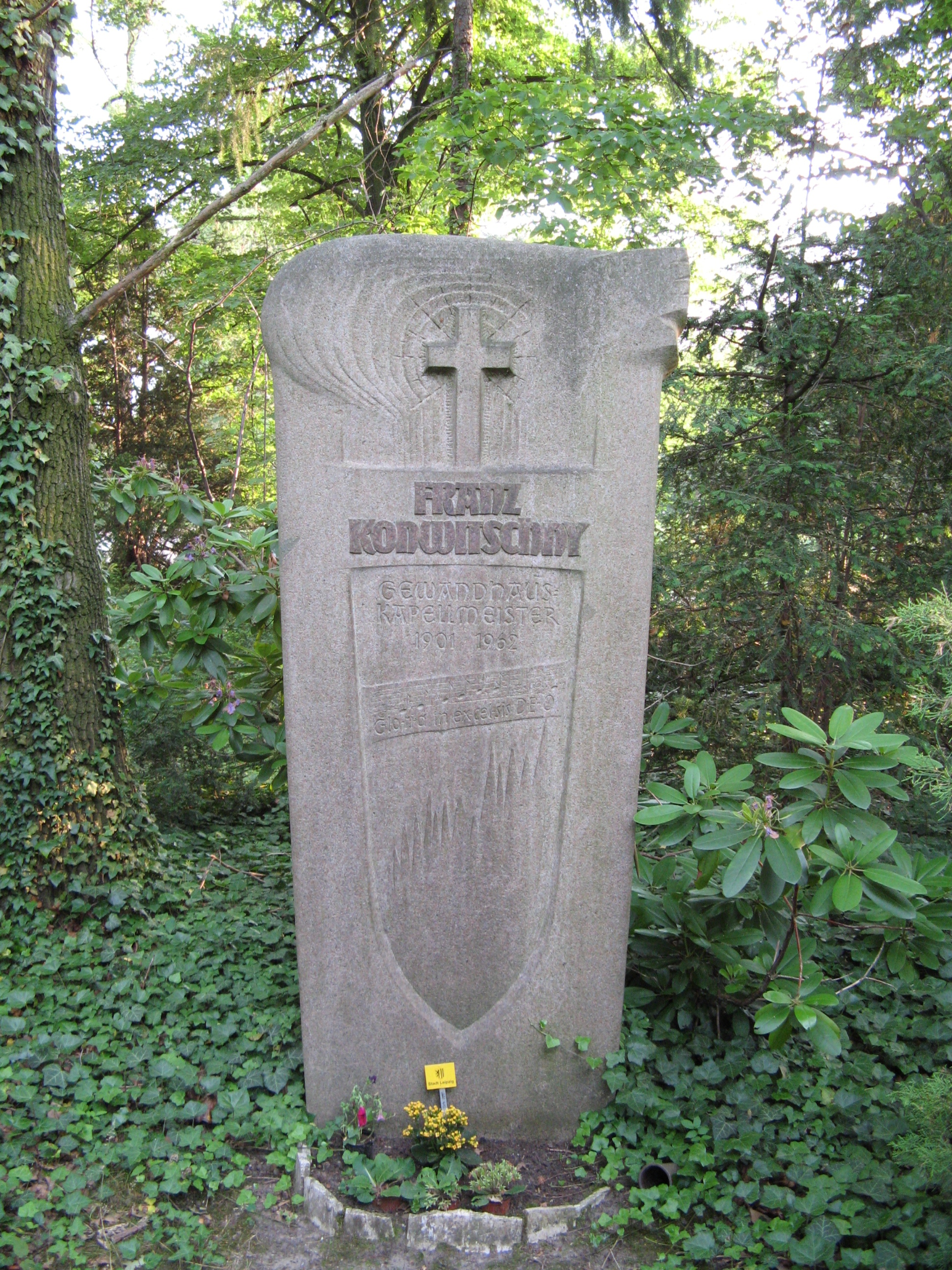
Gravesite of Franz Konwitschny at southern cemetery Leipzig

== Recordings ==
- Wagner, Tristan und Isolde, Ludwig Suthaus, Gottlob Frick, Margarete Bäumer, Karl Wolfram, Erna Westenberger – Franz Konwitschny, conductor: Leipzig Gewandhaus Orchestra, 21–23 October 1950 (Walhall Eternity Series WLCD 0118)
- Wagner, Tannhäuser, Hans Hopf, Gottlob Frick, Dietrich Fischer-Dieskau, Elisabeth Grümmer – Franz Konwitschny, conductor: Staatskapelle Berlin. Chor der Berliner Staatsoper, Recorded in October 1960
- Wagner, Der fliegende Holländer Dietrich Fischer-Dieskau, Marianne Schech, Rudolf Schock, Gottlob Frick, Fritz Wunderlich - Franz Konwitschny, conductor: Staatskapelle Berlin. Chor der Deutschen Staatsoper Berlin 1960

Cultural offices
| Preceded by Erich Kleiber | Music Director, Berlin State Opera; 1955-1962 | Succeeded by Otmar Suitner |
