= Max Butting =

German composer (1888–1976)

- Born: 6 October 1888; Berlin, German Empire
- Died: 13 July 1976 (aged 87); East Berlin, East Germany
- Education: Akademie der Tonkunst (Academy of Composition)
- Occupation: composer

Max Butting (6 October 1888 – 13 July 1976) was a German composer.

== Life ==
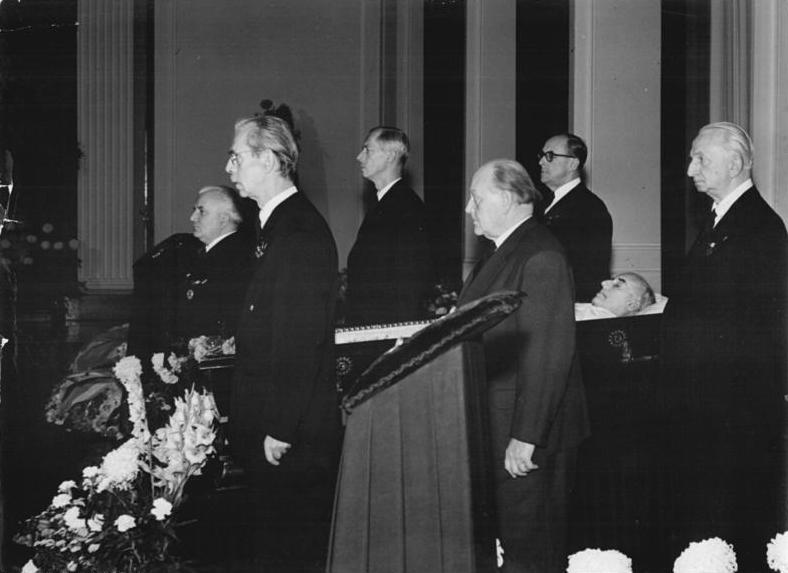
Max Butting (1958)

Max Butting was the son of an ironmonger and of a piano teacher. He received his first musical instruction from his mother and later from the organist Arnold Dreyer. After attending secondary school (Realgymnasium), he studied at the Akademie der Tonkunst (Academy of Composition) in Munich from 1908 to 1914. There, he received instruction in composition from Friedrich Klose, conducting from Felix Mottl and Paul Prill, as well as singing from Karl Erler. He also attended lectures in psychology, philosophy and musicology at the Ludwig-Maximilians-Universität München. Butting learned composition by private instruction from Walter Courvoisier, for the most part, whom Klose had recommended to him after a disagreement.

Butting was medically unfit for service in World War I. On the urging of his father, he worked as an assistant in his father's business when he returned to Berlin in 1919, where he remained until 1923. However, he was allowed sufficient free time for composing. He quickly got in contact with other young artists and became friendly with Walter Ruttmann and Philipp Jarnach, among others. In 1921, Butting was admitted into the left-wing Novembergruppe and he led their musical events until 1927. In 1925, he was also a musical journalist for the "Sozialistischen Monatsheften" (Socialist Monthly Magazine). His works became better known through performances at the music festivals of the Gesellschaft für Neue Musik (Society for New Music), where Butting worked as a member of the board in the German section between 1925 and 1933, and at the Donaueschinger Musiktage. In 1929, Hermann Scherchen conducted Butting's Third Symphony in Geneva, which also brought him recognition at the international level. In the same year, the composer became the vice-chairman of the Genossenschaft deutscher Tonkünstler (Co-operative of German Composers).

Butting was one of the first composers to confront his art with the medium of radio. He was thus a member of the cultural advisors of the Funkstunde (Radio Hour) from 1926 until 1933 and the leader of a studio for radio interpretation at the Klindworth-Scharwenka Conservatory from 1928 until 1933. Aside from that, he held master courses in radio composition at the Rundfunkversuchsstelle (Radio Experimental Office) of the Berliner Hochschule für Musik (Berlin College of Music), where Ernst Hermann Meyer was one of his students.

In January 1933, Butting was even named a member of the Prussian Academy of Arts, however it became clear soon after Adolf Hitler took power that he was not wanted by the National Socialists. Until 1938, Butting was still able to work in the copyright company, STAGMA. After that, he again had to exist from his father's ironmonger business, partial ownership of which he had inherited after his father's death in 1932, and which he took over on his own at the beginning of 1939. To ensure the survival of the business and thus be able to support himself, the composer finally found himself obliged to join the Nazi Party in 1940.

After the Second World War, Butting gave up his business activities and lived as a freelance composer in East Berlin. In 1948, he became a member of the Kulturbund der DDR (Cultural Association of the DDR) and chief editor in the state radio committee of the GDR. In 1950, he was a founding member of the DDR Academy of Arts, Berlin of which he was vice-president from 1956 until 1959, and a board member of the Verband Deutscher Komponisten und Tonsetzer (Association of German Composers, the VdK of the GDR) as of 1951, as well as the leader of the advisory council of the Anstalt zur Wahrung der Aufführungsrechte (AWA, Institute for the Protection of Performance Rights). In the GDR, Butting received numerous honors: he received the silver Patriotic Order of Merit in 1961 and later in gold, an honorary doctorate from the Humboldt University of Berlin in 1968, and the National Prize of East Germany in 1973.

== Tone language ==
Butting's music at first took up the style of Anton Bruckner and Max Reger and moved closer to more modern trends in the 1920s. He gradually managed to develop a distinctive personal style, which is pre-eminently characterized by counterpoint and is equally close to both musical neoclassicism and expressionism. The meter/rhythm is complex for the most part and commonly contains changes in time. The harmony varies within an often dissonant, sharpened tonality. From time to time, there are twelve-tone themes, for example in Sinfonie Nr. 9, however Butting never develops a true dodecaphony, in the sense of Arnold Schoenberg, whom he critically admired. The composer also formally oriented himself on traditional models, such as the sonata form, however he commonly varied it or gave it up entirely in more than a few works in favor of a development form which has no breaks. He always tried to find an individual form for each work, as his symphonic works show in an exemplary manner, in which all cyclic formations are represented, from single-movement to five-movement works.

A moderately productive composer before 1945 and almost completely silenced during the Nazi regime, Butting experienced a new creative impetus after the end of the war. The largest number of his works by far were created in the GDR. He then made it one of his responsibilities to also write "everyday music", which was supposed to fulfill the state demand for a popular, easy-to-understand art. He started from some works he had already written especially for the radio at the end of the 1920s, which are stylistically close to sophisticated light music.

In the center of Butting's works are the ten symphonies, which identify him as one of the most important German symphonists of his generation. In addition to these, he wrote a chamber symphony for thirteen solo instruments, two symphoniettas ("little symphonies") and a triptychon for large orchestra. Aside from that, he wrote chamber music above all, among which ten string quartets stand out. Others of his remaining works include a piano concerto and a flute concerto, numerous shorter orchestral pieces, predominantly small piano works, as well as the oratorio "Das Memorandum", the opera "Plautus im Nonnenkloster" after Conrad Ferdinand Meyer and several cantatas.

== Selected works ==
=== Orchestral works ===
- Trauermusik op. 12 (1916)
- Symphony No. 1 op. 21 for 16 Instruments (1922)
- Chamber Symphony for 13 Instruments op. 25 (1923)
- Symphony No. 2 op. 29 (1926)
- Symphony No. 3 op. 34 (1928)
- Sinfonietta mit Banjo op. 37 (1929)
- Serene Music op. 38 (1929)
- Symphony No. 4 op. 42 (1942)
- Symphony No. 5 op. 43 (1943)
- Symphony No. 6 op. 44 (1953, first version 1945)
- Totentanzpassacaglia op. 51 (1947)
- Symphony No. 7 op. 67 (1949)
- Sonatina for String Orchestra op. 68 (1949)
- Concerto for Flute and Orchestra op. 72 (1950)
- Symphony No. 8 "Die Urlaubsreise" op. 84 (1952)
- Symphonic Variations op. 89 (1953)
- Five Serious Pieces after Dürer op. 92 (1955)
- Symphony No. 9 op. 94 (1956)
- Sinfonietta op. 100 (1960)
- Symphony No. 10 op. 108 (1963)
- Concerto for Piano and Orchestra op. 110 (1964)
- Triptychon op. 112 (1967)
- Stationen, op. 117 (1970)
- Gespenster besuchten mich, op. 120 (1972)

=== Chamber music ===
- String Quartet No. 1 in A major op. 8 (1914)
- String Quintet in C minor op. 10 (1915)
- String Quartet No. 2 in A minor op. 16 (1917)
- String Quartet No. 3 in F minor op. 18 (1918)
- String Quartet No. 4 in C sharp minor op. 20 (1919)
- Quintet for Violin, Viola, Cello, Oboe and Clarinet op. 22 (1922)
- Miniatures for String Quartet op. 26 (1923)
- String Quartet No. 5 op. 53 (1947)
- Piano Trio op. 54 (1947)
- String Trio (1952)
- String Quartet No. 6 op. 90 (1953)
- String Quartet No. 7 op. 95 (1956)
- String Quartet No. 8 "Die Nachgeburt" op. 96 (1957)
- String Quartet No. 9 op. 97 (1957)
- String Quartet No. 10 op. 118 (1971)

=== Piano music ===
- 15 Short Piano Pieces, op. 33 (1927)
- Sonata op. 82 (1951)
- Sonatina for Gretl op. 87 (1952)
- Two Toccatas op. 88 (1953)

=== Vocal music ===
- "Das Memorandum" op. 52, Oratorium (1949; libretto: Max Butting)
- "An den Frühling" op. 59, Kantate (1948; libretto: Max Butting)
- "Der Sommer" op. 61, Kantate (1948; libretto: Max Butting)
- "Der Herbst" op. 62, Kantate (1948; libretto: Max Butting)
- "Der Winter" op. 63, Kantate (1948; libretto: Max Butting)
- "Die Lügengeschichte vom schwarzen Pferd" op. 71, Kantate (1949; libretto: A. Eckener)
- "Plautus im Nonnenkloster" op. 98, Oper (1958; libretto: Hedda Zinner)

== Literature ==
- Max Butting: Musikgeschichte, die ich miterlebte. Henschel, Berlin 1955.
- Dietrich Brennecke: Das Lebenswerk Max Buttings. Deutscher Verlag für Musik (DVfM), Leipzig 1973.
