= Alfred Charles Coles =

English physician, microbiologist and academic author

Alfred Charles Coles MRCP FRSE (1866–26 September 1944) was an English physician, microbiologist and academic author. He was described as "a master of the microscope". He made major advancements in the understanding of Hodgkin’s disease and in the blood parasites of both animals and man.

== Life ==
He was born in Bournemouth the son of Alfred Case Coles a pharmacist. He studied medicine at the University of Edinburgh graduating with an MD in 1893. He received a DSc in Public Health in 1903. He became a Member of the Royal College of Physicians (London) in 1907. He worked as a physician at the Royal National Sanatorium from 1914 and as a Consultant at the Royal Victoria Hospital in Bournemouth.

He was elected a Fellow of the Royal Society of Edinburgh in 1903. His proposers included Sir Thomas Richard Fraser, Alexander Crum Brown, Charles Hunter Stewart and James Buchanan Young. Being beyond conscription age in the First World War he served as a volunteer in a military hospital at Mont Dore in France. This appears to have been independent of any regiment as the only Alfred C. Coles on record in the army does not co-relate to his function as a doctor.

On retiral he continued in his studies plus was a keen ornithologist. He died at his home in Bournemouth on 26 September 1944.

== Publications ==
- The Blood, How to Examine and Diagnose Its Diseases (1898) republished 1905
- Clinical Diagnosis Bacteriology including Serum Diagnosis and Cytodiagnosis (1904)
- Critical Microscopy: How to get the most out of the Microscope (1921)

== Family ==
In 1924 he married Frances Edith Bagshaw.
