= Marguerite Kirmse =

British artist

- Born: 14 December 1885; Bournemouth, England
- Died: 12 December 1954 (aged 68); Bridgewater, Connecticut

Marguerite Louisa Kirmse (14 December 1885 - 12 December 1954) was a British artist who emigrated to the United States; she specialised in drawings and latterly etchings of dogs.

== Early life ==
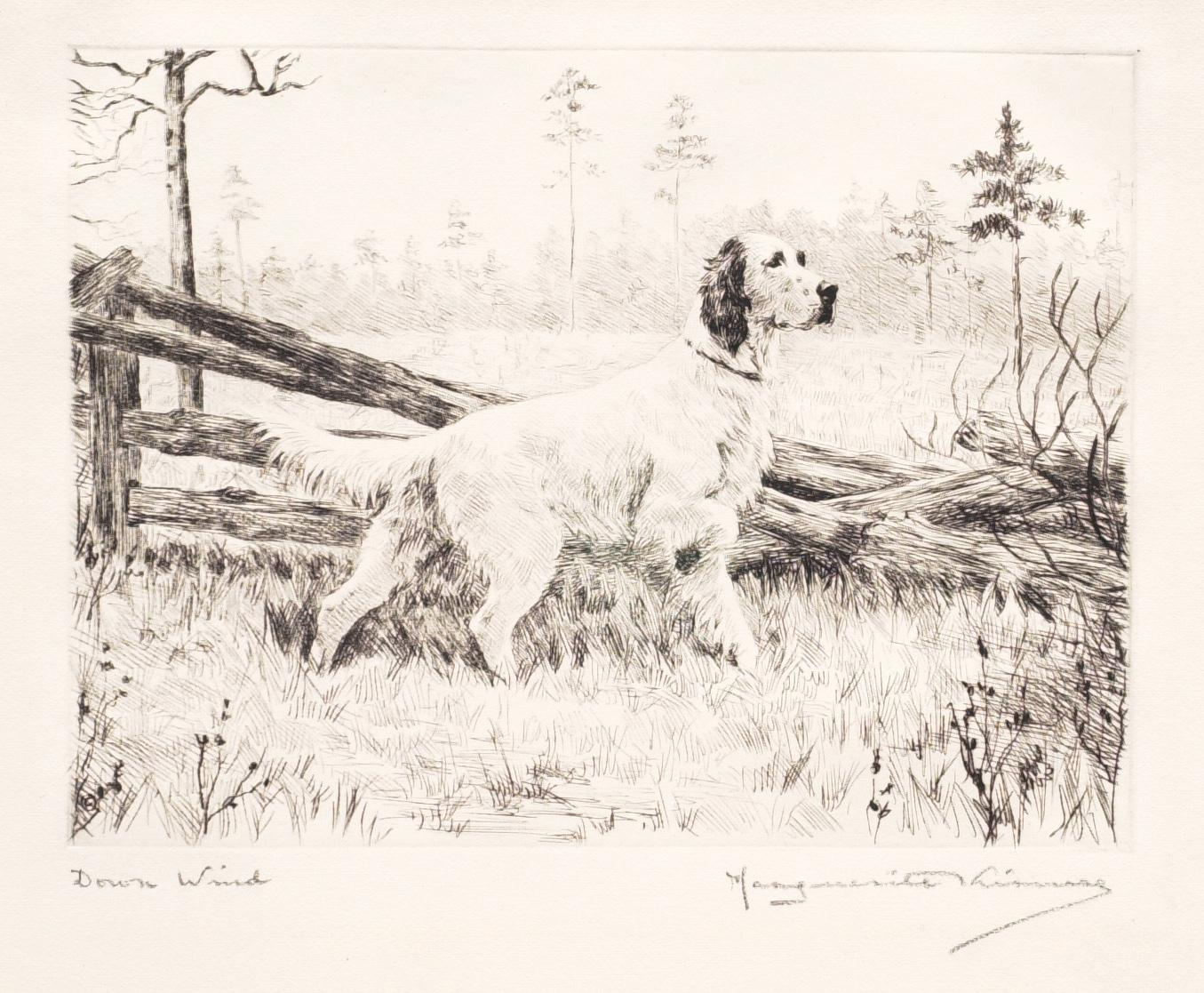
Down Wind, drypoint on paper. Sterling and Francine Clark Art Institute, Williamstown, Massachusetts, USA

Marguerite was born in Bournemouth, then in Hampshire, the second daughter of Richard and Lea Kirmse, respectively of German and Swiss origin, proprietors of a private school. She was the younger sister of the artist Persis Kirmse, who similarly specialised in dogs and cats.

== Career ==
Marguerite first trained as a harpist at the Royal Academy of Music but spent much of her spare time drawing animals. She went to the United States in 1910 on holiday with friends but stayed there. She was not successful in advancing her musical career and focussed her attention increasingly on her animal drawing, which she developed by frequent sketching trips to the Bronx Zoo.

In 1921 she started producing etchings of dogs, for which she became well known. She published Dogs (1930) and Dogs in the Field (1935) and produced many other works as book illustrations and commissions. She illustrated two books by Rudyard Kipling, "Lassie Come-Home" by Eric Knight, and many other children's books.

In 1924 she married George C. Cole, with whom she ran the Tobermory kennels near Bridgewater, Connecticut.
