= Persis Kirmse =

British artist

Elizabeth Persis Esperance Kirmse
- Born: 1884; Bournemouth, United Kingdom
- Died: 18 May 1955 (aged 70–71); Tunbridge Wells, United Kingdom
- Known for: Painting

Elizabeth Persis Esperance Kirmse (1884 in Bournemouth – 18 May 1955 in Tunbridge Wells) was a British artist and illustrator known for her works of cats and dogs.

She was the daughter of Richard and Lea Kirmse, respectively of German and Swiss origin, the proprietors of a private school in Hampshire. She produced oil paintings, works in pastels, and etchings of pets, often as commissions, and illustrated books, postcards, and calendars.

She produced illustrated versions of scenes from Shakespeare using animal characters, including Shakespeare at the Kennels (1934), Shakespeare with the Pets (1935), Shakespeare at the Zoo (1936) and Shakespeare and the Birds (1938). Her illustrations were also used in books by Frances Pitt and E.V. Lucas. Her work was exhibited at the Art Institute of Chicago in 1916.

Her sister, Marguerite Kirmse (1885–1954), was also an artist, specialising in etchings of dogs.

== Published works ==
Author and illustrator

- Persis Kirmse (1938). Shakespeare and the Birds. Methuen.
- Persis Kirmse (1934). Shakespeare at the Kennels, Etc. [Drawings of Dogs Suggested by Lines from Shakespeare.]. London.
- Persis Kirmse (1936). Shakespeare at the Zoo. Methuen & Company.
- Persis Kirmse (1935). Shakespeare with the Pets: A Book of Drawings. Methuen.

Illustrator

- Edward Verrall Lucas; Persis Kirmse (1932). The Day of the Dog ... Illustrated by Persis Kirmse. London.
- Edward Verrall Lucas (1936). Dinmont Day-by-Day ... Illustrated by Persis Kirmse. [Reprinted from "Punch."]. London.
- Edward Verrall Lucas; Persis Kirmse (1931). No-Nose at the Show. Drawings by Persis Kirmse. Verses by E.V. Lucas. Methuen & Company.
- Frances Pitt; Persis Kirmse (1932). Scotty. The adventures of a Highland fox ... With many illustrations by Persis Kirmse. Longmans & Company.
