= The Guardian Weekly =

News magazine based in London, England

- The Guardian Weekly (15 February 2019)
- Type: Weekly news magazine
- Format: News magazine from 12 October 2018.
- Owner: Guardian Media Group
- Editor: Graham Snowdon
- Founded: 4 July 1919; 106 years ago
- Political alignment: Centre-left
- Language: English
- Headquarters: Kings Place, London, England
- Sister newspapers: The Guardian, The Observer
- ISSN: 0959-3608
- Website: theguardian.com/weekly

The Guardian Weekly is an international English-language news magazine based in London, England. It is one of the world's oldest international news publications and has readers in more than 170 countries. Editorial content is drawn from its sister publication, the British daily newspaper The Guardian, both of which are published and owned by the Guardian Media Group. It also contained content from the Sunday newspaper The Observer, until it was sold to Tortoise Media which took control on 22 April 2025.

The Guardian Weekly is currently edited by Graham Snowdon.

== History ==
=== Early years ===
The first edition of the Manchester Guardian Weekly was printed on 4 July 1919, a week after the signing of the Treaty of Versailles. The Manchester Guardian viewed itself as a leading liberal voice and wanted to extend its reach, particularly in the United States, in the changing political climate after the First World War. The Weekly had the stated aim of "presenting what is best and most interesting in the Manchester Guardian, what is most distinctive and independent of time, in a compact weekly form". The initial reception was good. Before long the Manchester Guardian could boast "there is scarcely a corner of the civilised world to which it is not being posted regularly", although the newspaper was banned in Nazi Germany for a time.

=== Evolution and editorship 1969–2007 ===
For a large part of its early life the newspaper was a half-broadsheet format. Initially the notion of ‘the best of the Guardian’ meant a weighty opinion piece for the front page. It evolved, under the editorship of John Perkin, in 1969, to include the use of pictures on the front page.

In 1971, the English edition of the French daily newspaper Le Monde folded and the Weekly took on its 12,000-strong subscription list as well as four pages of Le Monde copy. A content deal was made with The Washington Post in 1975. Dedicated pages from both publications augmented Guardian articles until a redesign in 1993, under new editor Patrick Ensor, led to their articles appearing across the Weekly. In the same year, content from The Observer began to appear after the UK Sunday title was purchased by Guardian Media Group.

Around this time the Weekly relocated from Cheadle, to the south of Manchester, to join the rest of the Guardian in London. This move afforded the Weekly better access to editors, leader writers and news features. In 1991, technological advances enabled the first transmission by modem of pages to an Australian print site. Under Ensor's editorship, the paper began to be produced using the desktop publishing program Quark XPress. It became a tabloid-sized publication; then, in 2005, when the daily Guardian newspaper converted from a broadsheet to the smaller, Berliner format, the Guardian Weekly shrank to a half-Berliner while increasing pagination to its now-standard 48 pages. Full-colour printing was also introduced. By the end of Ensor's editorship, curtailed by his death from cancer in 2007, more advances in technology meant that even Weekly readers in the most remote locations were able to access the internet.

=== Since 2007 ===
The appointment of Australian Natalie Bennett as Ensor's successor coincided with the Guardian’s move to a digital-first publishing strategy. Breaking news stories were now launched on the Guardian's fast-growing website, rather than held back to meet print deadlines. In 2007 a digital edition of the Guardian Weekly was created, an editor's blog was added and a presence on social media sites Facebook and Twitter came soon after. During her editorship, Bennett emphasised the need for the Weekly’s agenda to be truly global and increased its coverage of environmental issues and the developing world. Her passion for environmental politics led to her departure from the paper in 2012. She would go on to become the leader of the Green Party of England and Wales until 2016.

The Guardian Weekly’s evolution continued under Abby Deveney, a newspaper, newswire and web editor with more than three decades of international experience living and working in North America, Asia and Europe. Under Canadian Deveney, the Weekly embraced long-form journalism, with a greater emphasis on insightful writing, deep analysis and lively features that showcase a well-rounded world view. Reportage of global themes and trends now features on the front page, while the back page is a stage for the Guardian’s influential opinion writers. Her global experience ensures that the Weekly never comes from one geographical perspective. This aim has been aided by the launch in 2011 of a Guardian US website, edited from New York City, followed two years later by a Sydney-based Guardian Australia site, which greatly increased the Weekly’s coverage opportunities in these key territories.

Deveney left the editorship in 2017 and was eventually replaced by Will Dean in April 2018. Graham Snowdon took over as editor in November 2023.

The Guardian Weekly was re-designed in October 2018 as a glossy magazine. It was announced that the circulation of the magazine would increase, and three different editions would be published: International, North American, and Australian. A European edition was added in 2024.

== Format ==
The title is printed at sites in the UK, Poland, Australia, New Zealand and the United States in a full-colour news magazine format. The standard publication runs to 64 pages since its change of format (from a newspaper) on 12 October 2018.

== Worldwide readership ==
Britain, Australia, the United States and Canada are the Guardian Weekly’s top markets, followed by New Zealand, France and Germany. With a following in more than 170 countries, the Weekly’s audience is spread around the world.

Surveys reveal that some 60% of subscribers had taken the paper for more than a decade. Readership tends towards a well-educated demographic. The typical reader is aged over 45, educated to at least degree level and either working in or retired from education, with a 59-41 male-female split.

Readers say typical reasons for subscribing include: a family habit of taking the Manchester Guardian; a spell working abroad in development or teaching; and retirement or emigration (often to Australia, New Zealand or North America). Others often report their route to initiation into the Guardian Weekly family came by having a copy passed along to them in a workplace or during a secondment.

=== Notable readers ===
The paper's readers include many world statesmen, including Nelson Mandela, who subscribed during his time in prison and described the paper as his "window on the wider world". George W. Bush was reportedly the first President of the United States since Jimmy Carter not to subscribe to the Guardian Weekly, breaking tradition with Ronald Reagan, George H. W. Bush and Bill Clinton.
