= Fritz Kirmse =

German violinist (born 1912)

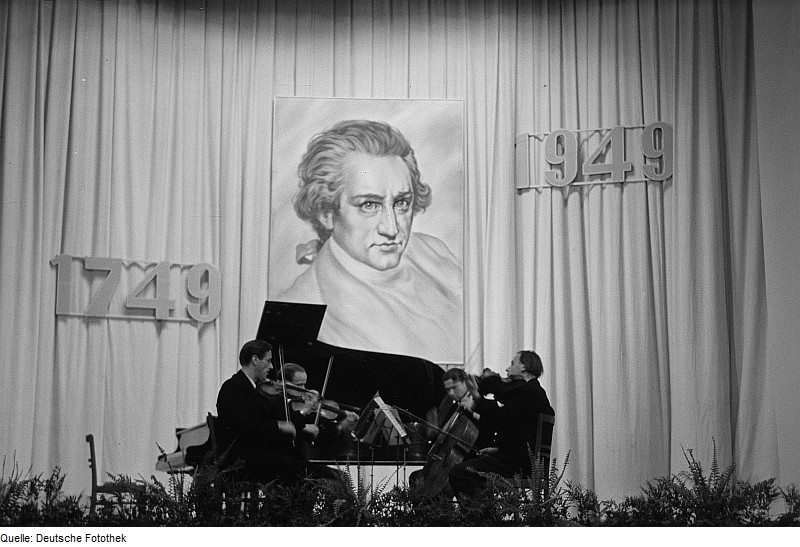
Fritz Kirmse as member of the Kirmse Quartet (1949)

Fritz Kirmse (born 11 February 1912, date of death unknown) was a German violinist and university lecturer. From 1934 to 1936 he was appointed to the Bayreuth Festival orchestra. From 1937 to 1939 he was first concertmaster of the Orchester des Opernhauses Halle.

== Life ==
Kirmse was born in Leipzig in 1912. He first received violin lessons from Emil Kolb and then studied with Walther Davisson and Charles Münch at the University of Music and Theatre Leipzig. Already during his studies he took part in the Gewandhaus concerts.

In August 1933, Kirmse was engaged with the 1st violins in the Niedersächsisches Staatsorchester Hannover. Die Musik in Hannover. Die musikalischen Strömungen in Niedersachsen vom Mittelalter bis zur Gegenwart unter besonderer Berücksichtigung der Musikgeschichte der Landeshauptstadt Hannover" (The music in Hannover. The musical trends in Lower Saxony from the Middle Ages to the present day with special emphasis on the musical history of the state capital of Hanover). Published on the occasion of the 325th anniversary of the Opera House Orchestra by the Society of Friends of the Opera House Orchestra, Sponholtz, Hanover 1961, p. 143. From 1934 to 1936 he was additionally appointed to the Bayreuth Festival orchestra: The Bayreuth Festival Orchestra. History, stories and anecdotes from then to now. Lienau, Berlin 1997, ISBN 3-87484-125-1, p. 138. He received the honorary title of chamber musician in June 1937. From July 1937 he worked as 1st concertmaster in the orchestra of the Halle Opera House. In 1939 he went to the Leipzig Symphony orchestra, but in the course of the transfer of radio musicians to other stations of the Großdeutscher Rundfunk in April 1941, he deliberately stayed in Leipzig and was offered a position as 3rd concertmaster. From 1947 to 1958 he changed back to the Leipzig Radio Symphony Orchestra. After that he worked under Erich Donnerhack at the State Entertainment Orchestra Halle.

In 1938/39, Kirmse was primarius of the string quartet of the city orchestra of Halle.(Quellenkataloge zur Musikgeschichte. Vol. 40). Noetzel, Wilhelmshaven 2007, ISBN 978-3-7959-0780-8, p. 225. After 1945 he was the first violinist of the Kirmse Quartet. From 1949 he was also a member of the Leipzig Beethoven Piano Trio.

In addition, he was a teacher at the Staatliche Hochschule für Musik Leipzig from 1946 to 1948. After that, he taught at the Staatliche Hochschule für Theater und Musik Halle. Among his students was the Gewandhaus musician Rolf Harzer.

== Discography ==
- Gian Francesco Malipiero: Violin Concerto (Urania Records 1954) – recording with Rolf Kleinert and the MDR Leipzig Radio Symphony Orchestra
- Johannes Brahms: Double Concerto (issued by Tahra) – recording of 1950 with Bernhard Günther, Hermann Abendroth and the Leipzig Radio Symphony Orchestra
