= Leo Spies =

German composer and conductor (1899–1965)

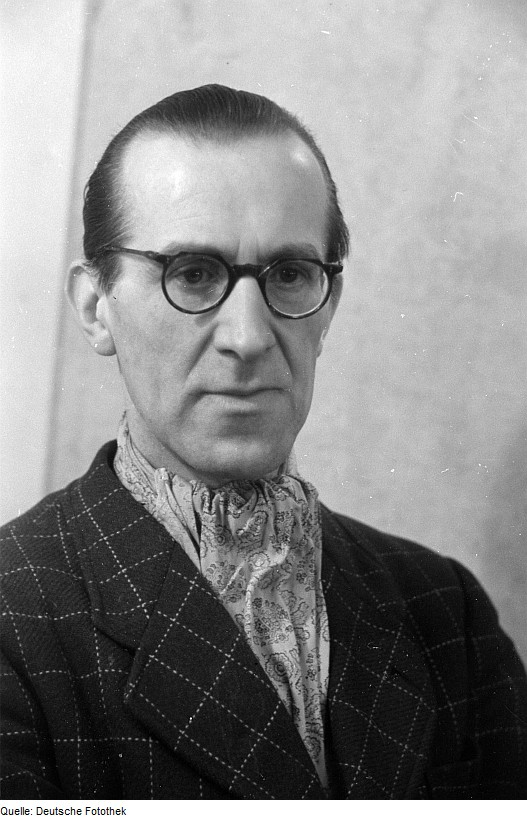
Leo Spies in 1946

Leo Spies (4 June 1899 – 1 May 1965) was a Russian-born German composer and conductor active in the musical and theatrical life of Germany, and especially in Berlin.

== Life and career ==
Spies was born in Moscow to a German diplomat and his wife. He had an older brother Walter Spies, who became an artist and musicologist, and from 1923 lived in Indonesia (then Dutch who spent most of his career in Bali, and sister Daisy Spies, who became a ballet dancer. He and his siblings were educated in Moscow before the family returned to Germany, where they settled in Dresden.

There Spies trained with Johannes Schreyer and Oskar von Riesemann. He studied at the Berlin Hochschule für Musik under Engelbert Humperdinck and Robert Kahn from 1916 to 1917.

In his early career Spies worked as a repetiteur in various German theatres and for Universum Film AG. During the late 1920s, he became involved with Hanns Eisler's circle and the workers' choral movement, for which he composed several choral works. He was the ballet conductor of the Berlin State Opera from 1928 to 1935 and the Deutsche Opernhaus from 1935 to 1944, when the country was ruled by the Nazi Party.

After the war, Spies served as director of studies and conductor at the Komische Oper from 1947 to 1954. During this period of the divided Germany, the opera was located within East Germany (German Democratic Republic).

== His music ==
Spies was influenced by Russian romanticism and the works of Janáček in his own compositions. He composed in virtually all the classical genres: ballets, concertos, symphonies, chamber music, piano sonatas, lieder, and choral music. His principal ballet works are Apollo und Daphne (1936), Der Stralauer Fischzug (1936), Seefahrt (1937), Die Sonne lacht (1942), Pastorale (1943), Die Liebenden von Verona (1944), and Don Quijote (1944).

He also composed incidental music for plays, including the 1946 Berlin production of Zum goldenen Anker (the German language adaptation of Marcel Pagnol's Trilogie marseillaise).

In 1956 Spies was awarded the National Prize of the German Democratic Republic (East Germany). He died in Ahrenshoop shortly before his 65th birthday and is buried in the Dorotheenstadt cemetery.
