= Friedrich Klose =

German composer (1862 - 1942)

Friedrich Klose (born 29 November 1862 in Karlsruhe, Margraviate of Baden-Durlach; died 24 December 1942 in Ruvigliana, Switzerland) was a German composer. He studied with Vinzenz Lachner in Karlsruhe, and then with Anton Bruckner in Vienna, and recorded his impressions of his time with Bruckner in a book. He taught at the Basel Conservatory and at the Akademie der Tonkunst in Munich, where his students included Max Butting, Wilhelm Petersen and Paul Ben-Haim.

His Mass in d-minor was written in response to Franz Liszt's death. His opera Ilsebill (1903) was inspired by the music of Richard Wagner and Richard Strauss, and the plot is based on the Brothers Grimm tale of a fisherman who catches a huge fish which grants ever increasingly more greedy wishes and this is reflected in the increasing complexity of orchestration during the opera. It was premiered in 1903 in Karlsruhe under the direction of Felix Mottl. He ended his career as a composer and a teacher in 1919 and retired to Switzerland.

== Works ==
=== Works for stage ===
Ilsebill, an opera; libretto: Hugo Hoffmann (1902, UA Karlsruhe 7. Juni 1903)

=== Works for chorus ===
Asklepiadische Strophen for men's chorus (text by Heinrich Leuthold, 1888)

Mass in d-minor for solo voices, chorus, orchestra and organ, op. 6 (1889) for which the following works were written later:

- Andante religioso op. 9 (Orchestral Intermezzo for his Mass op. 6, 1894)
- Vidi Aquam op. 10 (Prelude for his Mass op. 6, 1894)
- Ave Maria for soprano and orchestra, op. 11 (Interlude for his Mass op. 6, 1894)
- O Salutaris Hostia for soprano, tenor and orchestra op. 12 (Offertory for his Mass op. 6, 1894)

Four Songs for Men's Chorus (1905)

Die Wallfahrt nach Kevlaar, a ballade for narrator, three choirs, orchestra and organ (text by Heinrich Heine, 1911)

Ein Festgesang Neros for tenor, chorus, orchestra and organ (text by Victor Hugo, 1912)

Der Sonne-Geist, oratorio for solo voices, chorus, orchestra and organ (text by Alfred Mombert, 1917)

=== Songs ===
14 Songs for voice and piano opus numbers 1-5 (1886-87)

Verbunden, song cycle for mezzo-soprano and piano, op. 8 (text by Friedrich Rückert, 1888)

Fünf Gesänge nach Giordano Bruno for voice and piano (1918)

=== Orchestral music ===
Jeanne d'Arc, tone poem (before 1881)

Loreley, tone poem (before 1881)

Elfenreigen (1892)

Festzug (1892)

Das Leben ein Traum, tone poem for narrator and a final chorus for women's choir (1896)

=== Instrumental chamber music ===
Elegie for violin or viola and piano, op. 7 (1889)

Prelude and double-fugue in c-minor using a theme by Anton Bruckner with a final chorale for brass (1907)

String quartet in E-flat major: "Ein Tribut in vier Raten entrichtet an Seine Gestrengen den deutschen Schulmeister" ("A tribute in four installments paid to His Grace the German schoolmaster") (1911)

=== Writing ===
Meine Lehrjahre bei Bruckner. 1927.

Bayreuth. Eindrücke und Erlebnisse. 1929.
