= Felix Mottl =

Austrian conductor and composer (1856–1911)

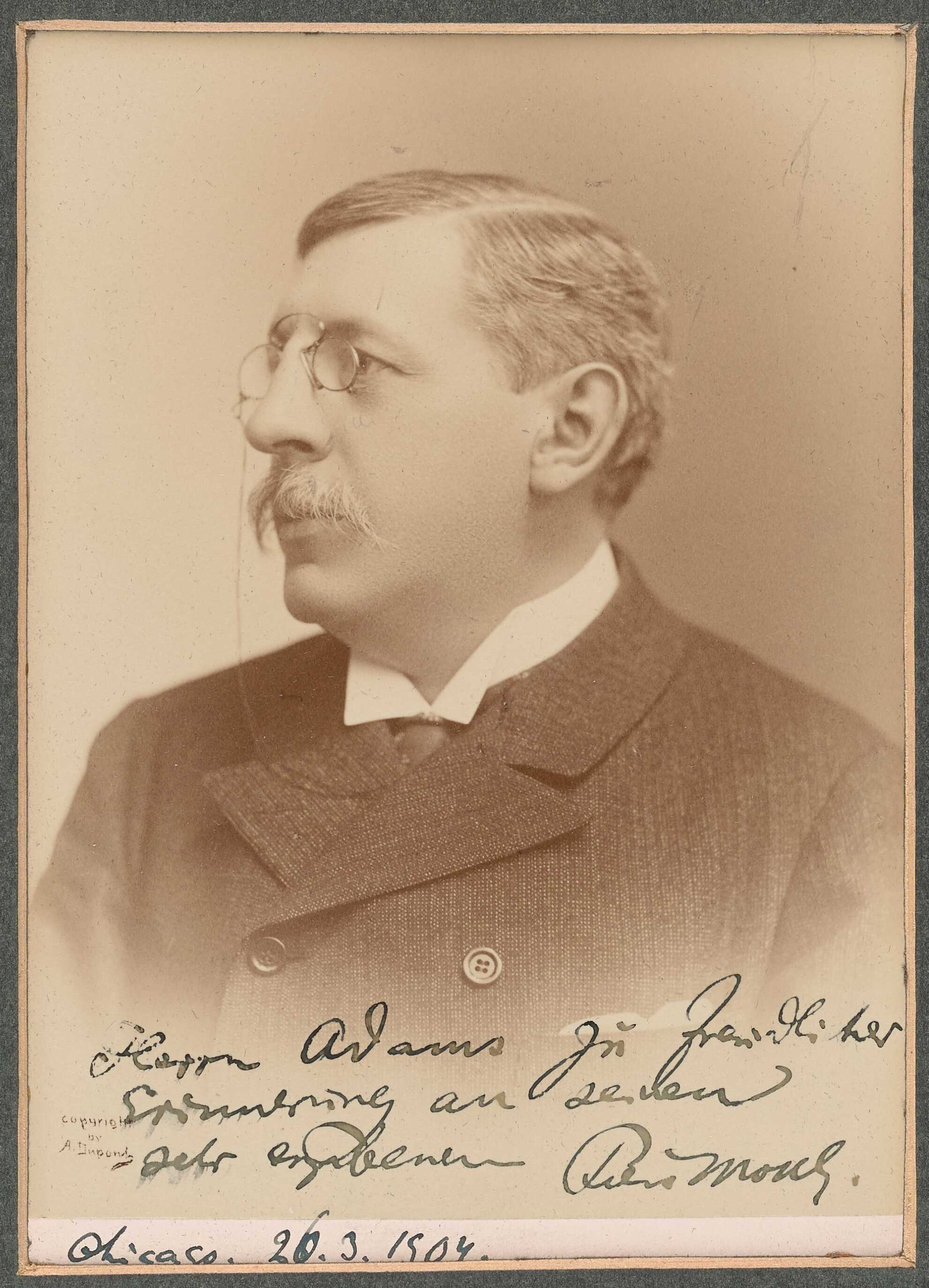
Photograph by Aimé Dupont before 1900, autographed by Mottl in 1904 (Newberry Library, Chicago)

Felix Josef von Mottl (between 29 July/29 August 1856 – 2 July 1911) was an Austrian conductor and composer. He was regarded as one of the most brilliant conductors of his day. He composed three operas, of which Agnes Bernauer (Weimar, 1880) was the most successful, as well as a string quartet and numerous songs and other music. His orchestration of Richard Wagner's "Wesendonck Lieder" is still the most commonly performed version. He was also a teacher, and his pupils included Ernest van Dyck and Wilhelm Petersen.

== Career ==
Mottl was born in Unter Sankt Veit, today Hietzing, Vienna in 1856. His date of birth has been reported variously as 29 July, 24 August, and 29 August. After early voice training at the Löwenburg Konvikt, a training school for the Imperial Court Chapel, he had a successful career at the Vienna Conservatory. He was soon recognized as a gifted conductor of Wagner's music, assisted Hans Richter in preparing the first complete Ring Cycle at Bayreuth in 1876, and himself conducted Tristan und Isolde at Bayreuth in 1886. The best-known version of Wagner's "Wesendonck Lieder" is an orchestration by Mottl.

From 1881 to 1903 he was chief conductor at the Karlsruhe Opera and was widely renowned for his work there, particularly in Wagner, Berlioz and Chabrier, whose operas he championed. In 1903 he conducted the premier of Friederich Klose's opera Ilsebill there to great acclaim. He also orchestrated Chabrier's Bourrée fantasque and Trois valses romantiques, and arranged a popular suite of orchestral excerpts from Christoph Willibald Gluck's operas. In later years, as a conductor of Wagner especially, he visited Amsterdam, London and New York, guest-conducting the Metropolitan Opera in 1903. He was made a director of the Academy of Arts, Berlin in 1904.

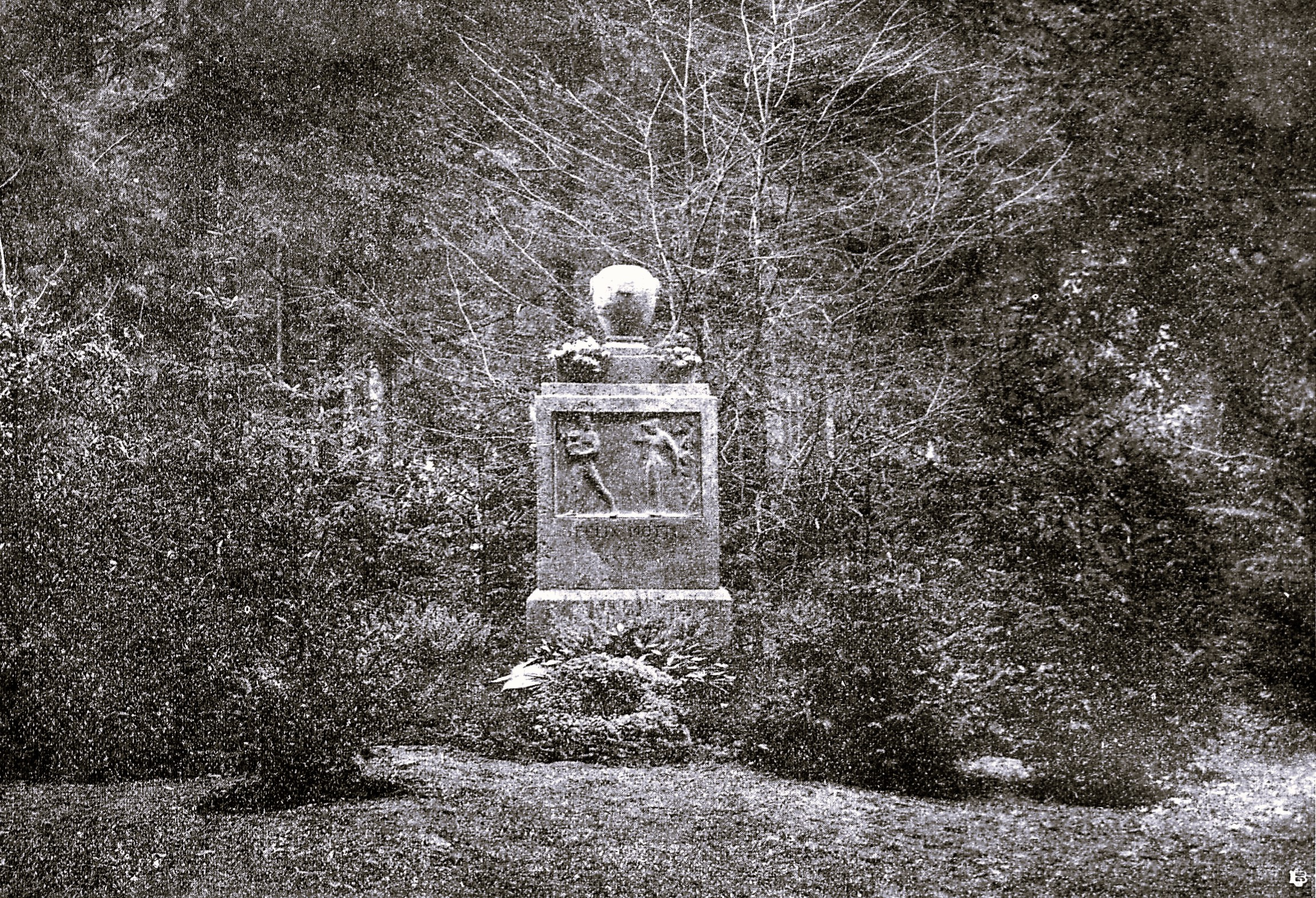
Mottl's grave monument

In June 1907 he cut some player piano rolls with Welte-Mignon, including his own piano transcription of the Prelude, the Love Duet and Brangäne's Warning from Tristan. He suffered a heart attack on 21 June 1911 while conducting his 100th performance of Tristan in Munich. He was taken to a hospital where he died 11 days later on 2 July, aged 54, but not before marrying his longtime mistress, the soprano Zdenka Faßbender.

His grave monument was made by Fritz Behn.

== See also ==
- List of Austrians in music

== Bibliography ==
- Frithjof Haas: Der Magier am Dirigentenpult. Felix Mottl. Karlsruhe: Hoepfner-Bibliothek. Info Verlag, 2006, ISBN 3-88190-424-7

== Recordings ==
- Felix Mottl today playing his 1907 interpretations. Selected works by Richard Wagner, The Welte-Mignon Mystery Vol. II
