= Marxist Workers' School =

Brochure created for the school in Berlin in early 1932, during the schools peak

Marxist Workers' School (German: Marxistische Arbeiterschule) (MASCH) was an educational institute founded in the winter of 1925 in Berlin, by the Berlin city office of the Communist Party of Germany (KPD). Its function was to enable workers to learn the basics of proletarian life and struggle, to teach the basic tenets of Marxism. It was co-founded by Hermann Duncker, Johann Lorenz Schmidt and Eduard Alexander. Hermann Duncker became the director of school. The school became very successful and by 1930, it had 4000 students in 200 courses, which prompted KPD officials to build 30 other schools in German cities e.g. Dresden and Chemnitz. After the seizure of power by the National Socialists in the spring of 1933, the schools were closed.

== History ==
The school was created in the tradition of the workers cultural movement with its commercial and Workers' Education Associations ("Arbeiterbildungsverein"). Following the reprisals of the Anti-Socialist Laws, social democratic and worker's associations were newly founded as training associations. Proletarian associations opened workers' libraries, e.g. in 1861 in Leipzig, where August Bebel was chairman of the library commission of the local workers' association. He formulated the goal of taking knowledge, art and culture away from bourgeoisie guardianship and "extracting from existing knowledge what benefited the working-class revolutionary struggle for emancipation."

After the separation of the Independent Social Democratic Party of Germany from the Social Democratic Party of Germany in 1914 and founding of the KPD on 30 December 1918, communists in Germany pursued the goal of a socialist revolution similar to the October Revolution in Russia in 1917. The educational work of the KPD was haphazard in the early years, following its formation. In the party congress of October 1919, leading members of the KPD including Duncker, Clara Zetkin and Edwin Hoernle pointed out the need to train party members. Social Democrat hiking courses, a traditional way to teach while walking, were established, but it was only with the 3rd World Congress of the Comintern and an orientation towards Soviet politics, that worker education really began. From the point of view of the KPD, its supporters had to be politically and intellectually trained, aligned and steeled beyond the previous social-democratic and trade union educational and social goals.

As early as 1932, the MASCH had become increasingly targeted, as state repression by the Nazis was started in earnest. On 25 November 1932, the central building was occupied by Schutzpolizei and several people were arrested and the register of teachers confiscated. House searches of lecturers subsequently followed. On 29 March 1933, the central school room in Berlin was closed by the police. Following this, many teachers from the school emigrated, but many teachers and student stayed to fight the Nazis in Germany.

== Goals ==
- The MASCH saw it ideological function as spreading communist ideals. The theoretical foundations of Marxism and emerging Leninism were taught.
- As described, the aim was to

"create a generally accessible school in which the working population of Berlin should be given the opportunity to learn the basic teachings of unadulterated Marxism and its application to all areas of proletarian life and struggle".

- The MASCH should reach the widest possible mass throughout Germany. In 1932, there were MASCH offshoots in 36 major German cities, as well as numerous branches in small towns.
- It was also about disseminating materials e.g. art posters along with leaflets and pamphlets, meant to incite communist agitation and propaganda. Interested laypeople were trained in the design and creation of suitable propaganda materials by artists from the Association of Revolutionary Visual Artists.

== Courses ==
- In addition to the historical or current affairs and politics, discussions were held on medical topics, progress in technology and natural sciences and, of course, community affairs.
- The school held a large number of courses including: stenography, typing, Russian and English, social and local politics, law. Lectures were also held on culture, arts, literature, film, radio, photography, theatre, music, natural sciences, medicine, sports, sexuality, children, education, the Soviet Union, foreign languages (including Chinese, Japanese and Esperanto), psychoanalysis and individual psychology, rhetoric, library studies, orthography and grammar, mathematics and women and young people studies. Fascism in its Italian and German forms was also analysed time and time again.
- In individual cases, the MASCH supported foreign visits, such as the 1932 visit to China by the communist sociologist and sinologist Karl August Wittfogel.
- Participants in the MASCH were in many cases members of the KPD, or became members, expedited under the impression of training and propaganda.

== MASCH locations ==
- Mitte in Berlin
- Bochum
- Brandenburg an der Havel
- Breslau
- Chemnitz
- Danzig
- Dessau
- Dresden
- Düsseldorf
- Duisburg
- Elberfeld
- Erfurt
- Essen
- Frankfurt
- Gelsenkirchen
- Hagen
- Halle
- Hamburg
- Cologne
- Königsberg
- Leipzig
- Nuremberg
- Recklinghausen
- Remscheid
- Solingen
- Stuttgart
- Wuppertal

== Teachers and lecturers at MASCH ==
Lecturers and teachers were, in addition to the employees and functionaries of the KPD, committed politicians, artists and scientists who were open to the labour movement. These included:

- Eduard Ludwig Alexander
- Hilde Benjamin
- Julian Borchardt Lecturer at the school.
- Franz Dahlem
- Philipp Dengel
- Hermann Duncker
- Albert Einstein
- Hanns Eisler
- Karl Ferlemann
- Alfred Frank
- Walter Gropius
- Kurt Hager
- Felix Halle
- Linus Hamann
- John Heartfield
- Fritz Heckert
- Otto Heller
- Georg Henke
- Edwin Hoernle
- Lothar Hofmann
- Bernhard Karlsberg
- Max Keilson
- Egon Erwin Kisch
- Hermann Werner Kubsch
- Jürgen Kuczynski
- Alfred Kurella
- Barbara Lantos
- Georg Lukács
- Kurt Massloff
- Willi Münzenberg
- Alexander Neroslow
- Theodor Neubauer
- Fritz Perls
- Erwin Piscator
- Alexander Radó
- Anni Reich
- Wilhelm Reich
- Ludwig Renn
- Albert Rosenfelder
- Ernest J. Salter
- Diethelm Scheer
- Otto Josef Schlein
- Johann Lorenz Schmidt
- Ernst Schneller
- Max Scholz
- Fritz Schulze
- Anna Seghers
- Manès Sperber
- Bruno Taut
- Helene Weigel
- Erich Weinert
- Karl August Wittfogel
- Friedrich Wolf

== Students at MASCH ==
- Karl von Appen
- Annemarie Balden-Wolff
- Éva Besnyő
- Werner Böhnke (Resistance fighter)
- Bertolt Brecht
- Elfriede Brüning
- Max and Charlotte Burghardt
- Gert Caden
- Eugen Eberle
- Martin Hänisch
- Ernst Hansch
- Bruno Leuschner
- Ludwig Marmulla
- Charlotte Müller (Resistance fighter)
- Erich Rackwitz
- Kurt Schwaen
- Johann Schwert
- Ernst Wolf

== Operations ==
The courses for workers cost only a few Pfennigs with the teachers working free of charge. In order to reach workers who could not regularly attend the courses through home studies, Duncker, Wittfogel and Goldschmidt published the booklets of the Marxist Workers Training (MAS) History of the International Labour Movement and Political Economy.

The Marxist Workers School was obviously quite undogmatic and practical in its approach, describing itself as the university of the working people. It was also used intensively by members of other social groups such as the intelligentsia and apparently nobody was excluded as they all belonged to the bourgeoisie.

The MASCH had 25 students in 1925 and by 1930/1931 had 4000 students. The number of lecturers rose to 160. At one single evening lecture, some 700 were present. In the winter semester of 1929/30 alone, 613 evening lectures were held. In 1932 there were around 2,000 courses. Both the technical staff and the teaching staff worked free of charge. Some of the lecturers were neither KPD members nor bound to a particular political party. The decisive criterion for admission as a MASCH teacher has become more and more: Are you also against fascism? On the 1932 January edition of the MASCH magazine Der Marxist, the slogan was emblazoned: Against Nazi theories!.

== Connections ==
- Albert Einstein taught at the Marxist Workers School, at the suggestion of Anna Seghers. He was in constant contact with other left-oriented people such as John Heartfield, Egon Erwin Kisch, Jürgen Kuczynski, Willi Münzenberg, Erwin Piscator, Annie Reich and Karl August Wittfogel.
- From 1932, a group of friends and discussions from members of the Berlin Marxist Workers School gathered around the national economist Arvid Harnack and his wife Mildred. These included the former Prussian Minister of Culture Adolf Grimme, the locksmith Karl Behrens, the couple Greta and Adam Kuckhoff and Leo Skrzypczynski, a proprietor of a firm manufacturing radio equipment.

== Bibliography ==
Literature by and of Hermann Duncker:

- Duncker, Hermann (1971). Der Marxist Marxist. Arbeiter-Schule; Schulungszeitschr [The Marxist Marxist. Workers school; Training journal]. Politladen-Reprint, No. 11. (in German) (Reprint 1931, No. 1/3 [u.] 1932, No. 1/5 ed.). Erlangen: Politladen. ISBN 9783920531182. OCLC 72936785.
- Duncker, Hermann (1995). Volkswirtschaftliche Grundbegriffe mit besonderer Berücksichtigung der ökonomischen Grundlehren von Karl Marx als Leitfaden für Unterrichtskurse. Edition 100 bei ISP, 1. (in German) (Reprint [der Ausg.] J.H.W. Dietz Nachfolger, Stuttgart 1908 ed.). Karlsruhe: ISP. ISBN 9783929008869. OCLC 39478406.
- Duncker, Hermann (1984). Ausgewählte Schriften und Reden aus sechs Jahrzehnten (1st ed.). Berlin: Tribüne. OCLC 11669467.
- Griep, Günter; Förster, Alfred; Siegel, Heinz (1976). Front cover image for Hermann Duncker, Lehrer dreier Generationen : e. Lebensbild Hermann Duncker, Lehrer dreier Generationen : e. Lebensbild (2nd ed.). Berlin: Verlag Tribüne. OCLC 3848946.
