= Albert Hotopp =

German political activist and writer (1886–1942)

- Born: 20 September 1886; Berlin, Germany
- Died: after 1 August 1942; Disappeared, probably in a labour camp Soviet Union
- Occupations: Politician writer
- Political party: SPD; USPD; KPD
- Spouse: Gertrud Horn (1897–1955)
- Children: 2 daughters

Albert Hotopp (20 September 1886 – 1 August 1942) was a German political activist and writer.

As an active member of the Communist Party of Germany he fell foul of the Nazi Germany authorities during the Machtergreifung in 1933. In 1934 he emigrated to the Soviet Union where he disappeared, probably dying in a labour camp, in the second half of 1942.

== Life ==
Albert Hotopp was born in what he would later describe as a "grey quarter of Berlin, on the east side of town, just beyond the city limits". His father worked as a blacksmith in a factory, earning 8 Marks a week and working ten hours each day. His mother supplemented the family income by taking in washing from the "fine houses". Albert himself started working when he reached the age of ten, delivering milk and bread products to middle-class homes in the early mornings. This involved starting work at four in the morning, from which he later claimed to have acquired a useful talent for getting by without very much sleep. Later he received a training as a waiter, and worked in this profession till 1904. In 1904 he relocated to Bremen where he worked as a machinist before joining the crew of a merchant steamer as a fireman and sailor. During this time he visited Britain and for the first time came across asn example of a workers' strike, something which he later recalled made a strong impression on him. While still a young man he joined the Social Democratic Party (SPD). He obtained a job as a mechanic/fitter with the railways, working on the network's signal boxes. In 1912 he left the SPD, as his political sympathies moved towards Anarcho-syndicalism. During the immediate prewar years he was an employee of the Trades Union Press. After that he was drafted into the army and served in the First World War as a radio operator.

In 1917 the SPD (party) split, primarily over the issue of continuing support for the war. By the time the war ended, towards the end of 1918, Hotopp had become a member of the anti-war Independent Social Democratic Party (USDP) which had been the left-wing breakaway group. He participated in the German Revolution of 1918–19. The period was one of ongoing splintering and reconfiguration on the political left in Germany, and in 1920 Hotopp switched his political allegiance, like many USDP members, to the recently formed German Communist Party. By now he was working as a fireman and crane operator: he was also active on the works council. He also held a position in the regional communist party and, from 1923, was undertaking courier work for The Party. Following a strike he was convicted of preparing to commit High Treason and sentenced to a four-year jail term most of which he served, between 1923 and 1926, in Cottbus. It was during this time that he began to write, producing narrative pieces that were published in the left-wing Rote Fahne ("Red Flag" newspaper). He was released early, in 1926, after which he headed up the Party policy team in the Berlin Prenzlauer Berg district and served on the local council till 1929. He joined the Red Front Fighters and, in 1928, the Association of Proletarian-Revolutionary Authors, through which he formed a close friendship with fellow-writer Willi Bredel. Hotopp's own priorities were evident, however, from his description of his writing as a "bye-products of [work as] a party official".

In 1933 the NSDAP (Nazi Party) took power, and there was a rapid transition to one- party government in Germany. All political parties (other than the Nazi Party) were now illegal, but the new Chancellor had, in opposition, been particularly vitriolic about the Communist Party. Till February 1934 Albert Hotopp continued to live, now illegally, in Germany, working as a Communist Party treasurer. He then emigrated to the Soviet Union, living in Moscow with his wife, Gertrud and their two daughters. He worked in German language publishing and, under the "party name" of "Hermann Lieben" as a teacher at the Institute for Foreign Languages.

There were numerous exiled German communists in Moscow, and they all used to report on one another to the Soviet authorities during the surge in political purges that accompanied growing political tensions domestically and internationally at this time. Such information demonstrated loyalty and was often blended with impressions or combined with denunciations. Hotropp himself provided a written report on Herwarth Walden, a fellow teacher at the Foreign Languages Institute who was later arrested. There was a perception that reports of this nature did not in themselves cause the authorities to arrest suspects, but they were certainly used by the NKVD where they provided evidential support for arrests that took place. Albert Hotopp's own turn came on 31 May 1941 when he was arrested. On 1 August 1942 he was condemned to death. Available records are silent as to what happened next, but it is likely that he died shortly afterwards, probably in a Soviet labour camp. His wife Gertrud and their daughters were sent to continue their lives in Kazakhstan. His widow finally made her way back to East Germany in 1955, after which she survived another thirty years. Albert Hotopp was formally rehabilitated by the Soviets in 1960.

== Output ==
Albert Hotopp's best known book is the novel, Fischkutter H.F. 13: it provides a realistic presentation of life at sea from a Communist perspective. Three subsequent narrative works that appeared in the Soviet Union had as their principal themes Workers' Life, Experiences of War and Resistance to Nazism.
