= Horst Salomon =

German novelist and screenwriter

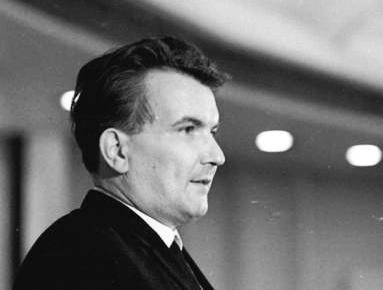
- Horst Salomon delivering a speech to (East) German Writers' Association (1966)
- Born: 6 May 1929; Pillkallen, East Prussia, Germany
- Died: 20 June 1972 (aged 43); Gera, Thuringia, East Germany
- Occupations: author poet dramatist
- Spouse: Rita (1934–1998)

Horst Salomon (6 May 1929 – 20 June 1972) was a German novelist and screenwriter. His successful career in the German Democratic Republic was cut short by his early death.

Salomon was regarded as a regime loyalist.

== Life ==
Horst Salomon was born in Pillkallen, then a small market town in East Prussia still recovering from the destruction of the First World War. His father was an agricultural worker. He nevertheless attended the Gymnasium (school) in Allenstein. When the war ended in May 1945, Salomon, by now aged 16, was one of the millions required to relocate, and he ended up in Thüringia, by now in the Soviet occupation zone, and which in October 1949 would become part of the Soviet sponsored German Democratic Republic. He became active in the no longer illegal local Anti-Fascist committee, later becoming active in the newly recreated Free German Youth.

"Soon we had bread and butter and shoes: the republic prospered, while the enemy – it was a 17 June – spat lies and stupidity out of their confused minds. Swastikas grinned wickedly from the insurgents' buttonholes. "Crush the workers – the power of the peasants!". Thus bawled the fascists. You stood firm, Comrade Ulbricht – with courage worthy of Stalingrad. We were strengthened and we trampled the "White Guard scum."

Horst Salomon, quoted by Mario Frank as the introduction for his biography of Walter Ulbricht (2001)

"Bald gab es Brot und Butter und Schuhe, die Republik gedieh, als der Feind – es war ein 17. Juni – Lüge und Dummheit in verworr`ne Hirne spie. Das Hakenkreuz es grinste frech im Knopfloch der Putschisten. "Stürzt die Arbeiter – die Bauernmacht" So grölten die Faschisten. – Du standest fest Genosse Ulbricht – Mit Stalingrader Mut. Wir waren stärker und zertraten die "weißgardistische" Brut."

Horst Salomon, quoted by Mario Frank as the introduction for his biography of Walter Ulbricht (2001)

In 1951 he started working at the important Wismut Uranium mines. He worked underground for 4½ years as a hewer. He was able to attend evening classes at the Mining School which enabled him to gain promotion, becoming a foreman and supervisor. He was a member of the Mine rescue service, and in July 1955 a member of the rescue team at the worst mining accident in the history of uranium mining at "Shaft 250" in Niederschlema.

At the same time, being a trusted party member, he worked as a "political inspector", which involved ensuring compliance with the party line. His poem "Genosse Walter Ulbricht" ("Comrade Walter Ulbricht"), which eulogised the country's leader and provided justification for what others saw as the gratuitously savage repression of the 1953 uprising, appeared in its original form in 1955. It received wide coverage within East Germany. Praising the leader in print became an important part of Salomon's contribution. He also worked as an "informal collaborator" (informer) for the Ministry for State Security from 1955, under the cover names "Ursel" and "Petrus". In 1958 he was sent to the „Johannes R. Becher“ Literature Institute (as it was then known) in Leipzig, where he was one of several of the country's more promising youthful writers to be mentored by Dr.Erna Barnick. He returned to Wismut in 1961, although his role within the mining enterprise was now cultural and political.

From 1965 he lived in Gera and supported himself as a journalist and freelance author.

== The writer ==
Horst Salomon: Published output (not a complete list)

* 1959: Die von morgen träumen * 1960: Das Lied ein gutes Wort * 1960: Für eine Minute
....(Agitprop; with Werner Bräunig) * 1960: Getrommelt, geträumt und gepfiffen (Poetry) * 1961: Vortrieb (Play) * 1961: Kantate der Freundschaft * 1964: Katzengold (Play) * 1967: Ein Lorbaß (Play) * 1968: Der Regenbogen (TV play) * 1969: Genosse Vater (TV & stage play) * 1971: Schwarzes Schaf (TV play)

Horst Salomon came to prominence as a poet. His volume "Getrommelt, geträumt und gepfiffen" won him the FDJ's de:Erich-Weinert-MedailleErich Weinert Medal in 1960. From 1962 he was working closely with the de:Großes Haus (Gera) Theatre in Gera, and it was here that his plays "Katzengold" (1964) and "Ein Lorbaß" (1967) had their original productions. The first of these won him the National Prize Class 3, and the second transferred to the Deutsches Theater in Berlin within a year, in a production by Benno Besson. "Ein Lorbaß", notably, was thereafter frequently revived in the East German theatres.
