= Karl Grünberg (writer) =

German writer and journalist

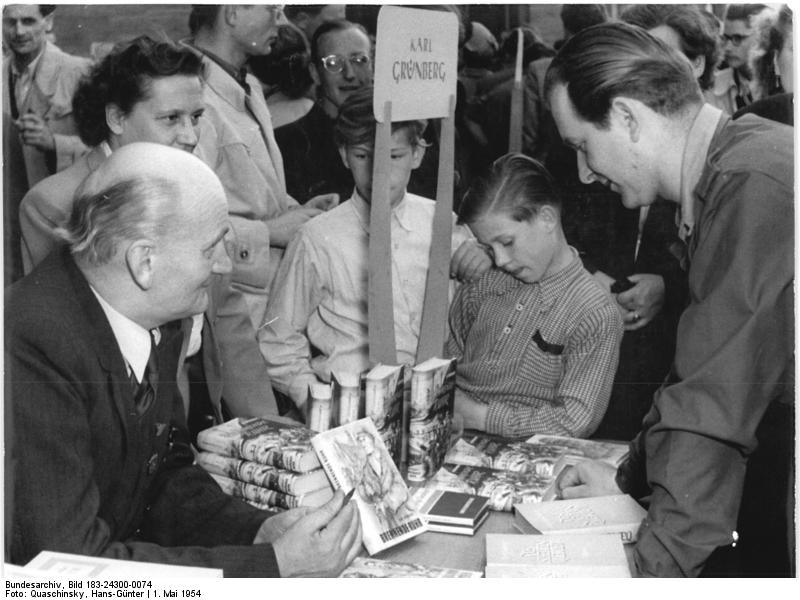
Karl Grünberg (left) signing books at the Berlin Writers' Bazaar, 1954

Heinrich Karl Grünberg (5 November 1891 – 1 February 1972) was a German communist writer and journalist.

== Biography ==
Grünberg was born in to the family of a shoemaker in Pankow. He joined the SPD in 1911. He was a reserve soldier during the WWI on the Eastern Front and after his demobilisation switched to the USPD in 1919 and finally to the KPD in 1920, where he became the temporary editor of the Die Rote Fahne. He began his writing career by publishing novels about his time as a soldier in the Ruhr Red Army. He became co-founder of the Association of Proletarian-Revolutionary Authors in 1928.

Grünberg was one of the authors whose works were thrown into the flames during the book burning organized by the Nazis on May 10, 1933. After 1933, Grünberg took part in the communist resistance against Nazism and was temporarily imprisoned in the Sonnenburg concentration camp but remained under constant surveillance from the Gestapo after his release. From 1936 he worked as a chemical technician at Schering AG in Berlin. From 1943 to 1945 he was conscripted into the air raid police in Essen and Berlin.

In the last days of April 1945, he and others founded the "People's Committee Berlin-Pankow". On 2 May 1945, this committee wrote the first appeal to the residents of the Berlin-Pankow district. Immediately after the end of the war, Karl Grünberg took over the rebuilding of the Pankow judicial system for a few months. For several years he was editor of the SMAD newspaper Tägliche Rundschau. From then on Grünberg worked again as a freelance writer.

== Works ==
- Die sozialistische Volkswehr, 1919
- Brennende Ruhr, 1928 (E-Text)
- Der Moloch, Roman, 1931
  - zweite Fassung: Gloria Victoria, 1960
- Das Schattenquartett, 1948
- Hitlerjunge Burscheidt, 1948
- Die Flucht aus dem Eden, 1949
- Golden fließt der Stahl, 1950
- Helden der Arbeit. Aus dem Leben und Wirken der Helden unserer Zeit, 1951 (darin u. a.: Hans Garbe – Der Mann im feurigen Ofen)
- Es begann im Eden, 1951/1953
- Episoden. Erlebnisreportagen aus sechs Jahrzehnten Kampf um den Sozialismus, 1960
- Mit der Zeitlupe durch die Weimarer Republik, 1960
- Der Goldschatz in der Taiga, 1961
- Die Getreuen vom Galgenberg, 1965
- Von der Taiga bis zum Kaukasus. Erlebnisse aus den zwanziger Jahren und später, 1970 (später unter dem Titel Zwischen Taiga und Kaukasus)
- Wie ich es sah, 1972
