= Radványi =

Radványi is a surname. Notable people with the surname include:

- Dávid Radványi (born 1989), Slovak footballer and agent, son of Mikuláš
- Géza von Radványi (1907–1986), Hungarian film director, cinematographer, producer and writer
- János Radványi (1922–2016), Hungarian-American diplomat, politician, political scientist and academic professor
- László Radványi (1900–1978), Hungarian-German writer and academic
- Mikuláš Radványi (born 1968), Slovak football manager and former player
