= Hertha Block =

German librarian (born 1906)

- Born: 1906
- Occupation: Librarian
- Organization: Association of Proletarian-Revolutionary Authors
- Known for: Anti-Nazi activism

Hertha Block (born 1906) was a German librarian. She was active in the Association of Proletarian-Revolutionary Authors, and was arrested by the Sturmabteilung in 1933 after meeting friends in a cafe that was a known meeting place for anti-Nazi groups. She continued working as a librarian while in women's prison during Nazi rule, and in autumn of 1945 was rehired to the library she had worked in before her arrest, where she helped to recover books which had been hidden to save them from the Nazi book burnings. Block worked for the library until retiring in 1972.

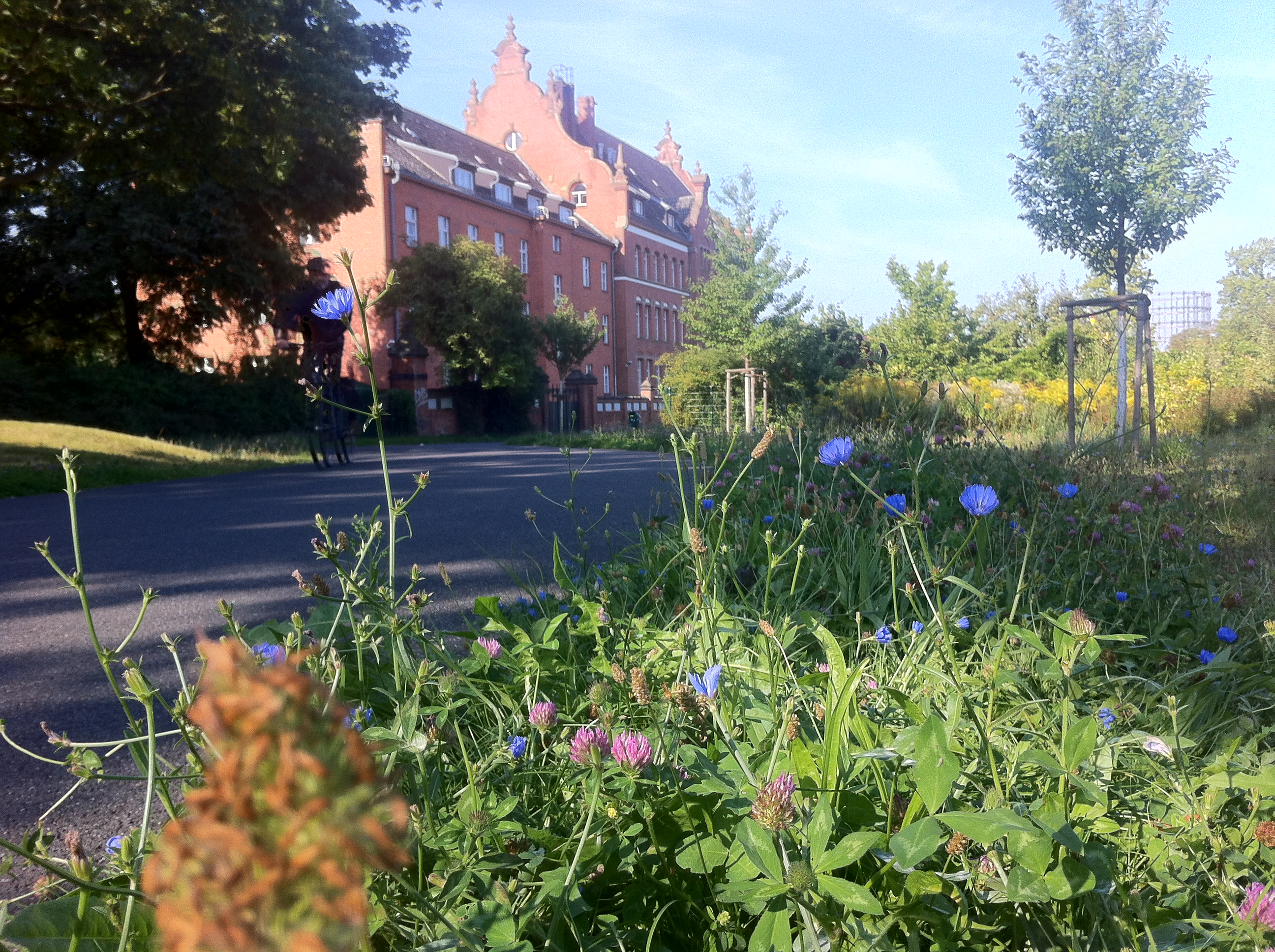
The Hertha Block Promenade in Berlin

The Hertha Block Promenade, which runs between the Tempelhof and Schöneberg districts in Berlin, is named for her.
