= Lilly Becher =

German writer (1901–1978)

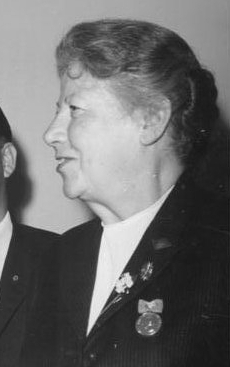
Becher in 1967

Lilly Becher (née Korpus, 27 January 1901, Nuremberg – 20 September 1978, Berlin) was a German writer, journalist and communist activist. Noted as one of the first anti-Nazi writers to produce documentary work dealing with the persecution of Jews in Nazi Germany during the 1930s, Becher was the wife of noted writer Johannes Becher and achieved significant recognition in East Germany as a writer in her own right.

== Biography ==
Becher was born as Lilly Korpus in Nuremberg on 27 January 1901 and studied at the Ludwig-Maximilians-Universität München and at Heidelberg University. Joining the Communist Party of Germany (KPD) during the first political climaxes of the post-World War I turmoil in 1919, she began a long career as a political journalist in the 1920s, working for the KPD newspaper Die Rote Fahne in 1921 and organizing a women's section of the Communist Party in 1922–1923.

She moved to Vienna in 1933, the year of Hitler's assumption of power in Germany, remaining for a year before moving to work for the Éditions du Carrefour publishing firm in Paris, where she helped publicize and document the plight of German Jews under her homeland's Nazi regime in Éditions du Carrefour's 1936 collection Der Gelbe Fleck: die Ausrottung von 500000 dt. Juden, (The yellow spot: the extinction of 500000 dt. The Jews), one of the first such documentary works on the subject. The book's foreword was written by Lion Feuchtwanger.

After meeting and marrying Johannes R. Becher, a revolutionary poet and fellow refugee from the Nazis in Paris, the two moved to the Soviet Union, living there until 1945. Both joined the National Committee for a Free Germany following the German invasion of the Soviet Union. With Germany's defeat in the Second World War, the Bechers returned to the Soviet occupation zone of the divided Allied-occupied Germany.

Lilly Becher worked as head editor of the Neuen Berliner Illustrierten, a major East German weekly magazine, from 1945 until 1950. Johannes Becher composed the lyrics to the German Democratic Republic's national anthem, Auferstanden aus Ruinen, during the same period.

Becher completed her husband's biography in 1963, five years after his death in 1958.

She won high official recognition by the East German government in the 1960s and 1970s, among them the prestigious East German Banner of Labor (Banner der Arbeit) for outstanding achievement in 1969.

Becher died on 20 September 1978.
