= Wilhelm Hasselmann =

German socialist (1844–1916)

Wilhelm Hasselmann (September 25, 1844 – February 25, 1916) was a German socialist politician, activist and editor of various social democratic newspapers.

== Politics ==
Hasselmann was elected in the Reichstag for the first time and was one of three General German Workers' Association (ADVA) members elected. Because of the increasing pressure of the anti socialist and union laws implemented by the Prussian Chancellor Otto von Bismarck, the two formerly competing parties, the General German Workers' Association and the Social Democratic Workers' Party of Germany (SPD) decided to unite in a joint congress initiated by Hasselmann and the spokesperson of the SDAP Wilhelm Liebknecht. Hasselmann was decisive in the creation of the newly formed Socialist Workers' Party of Germany (later Social Democratic Party of Germany) Gotha Program. Karl Marx later mockingly referred to Hasselmann as the "Berlin Marat" in his work Critique of the Gotha Programme.

In 1876 he published the newspaper Die Rote Fahne (the name was later re-used for the KPD organ), which was initially conceived as a pamphlet and then as a revolutionary weekly newspaper, Hasselmann came in to conflict with August Bebel. Bebel accused him of using his newspaper to displace the new party organ of the Social Democrats, Vorwärts behind the backs of the party executive (Central Election Committee) and thus wanting to split the SAP.

Hasselmann, becoming more of an outcast with his radical positions both in the pro-government conservative circles and within the SAP, remained relatively popular among the poorer working class. His popularity with the underprivileged classes of the population was expressed for example, in a nursery rhyme that was widespread locally at the time: "Now we choose the Hasselmann then eat the Brodt en Kastemann"; 'Kastemann' was a colloquial expression for a pfennig.

== Works ==
- Sozial-politische Blätter zur Unterhaltung und Belehrung für die deutschen Arbeiter. Ihring, Berlin 1873–1874 (Jg. 1. 1873, Lieferg 1. Jg. 2. 1874, Lieferg 12, Nr 3. Hrsg. u. red. v. W. Hasenclever; W. Hasselmann)
- Die Regierung des Deutschen Reichs und der Deutsche Reichstag in ihrer Stellung zur Sozialdemokratie. Die Reden des Preußischen Ministers Eulenburg und der Abgeordneten Hasselmann und Bamberger in der Reichstagssitzung am 29. Januar 1876. Verlag der Genossenschafts-Buchdruckerei, Leipzig 1876
- Die Angelegenheit Fritzsche-Hasselmann vor dem Deutschen Reichstage. Stenographischer Bericht über die Reichstagssitzung am 19. Februar 1879. Verlag der Genossenschafts-Buchdruckerei, Leipzig 1879
- Die Angelegenheit Fritzsche-Hasselmann vor dem deutschen Reichstage am 23.Februar 1880. Antrag des Abgeordneten Wilhelm Hasenclever. Verlag der Genossenschafts-Buchdruckerei, Leipzig 1880
