= Hans Lorbeer =

German politician and writer

- Born: August 15, 1901; Lutherstadt Wittenberg, Province of Saxony, German Empire
- Died: September 7, 1973 (aged 72); Lutherstadt Wittenberg, East Germany
- Occupations: Politician, writer

Hans Lorbeer (15 August 1901 – 7 September 1973) was a German politician and writer.

== Life ==
Hans Lorbeer was born as the illegitimate child of a worker girl in Lutherstadt Wittenberg in the Province of Saxony and grew up with foster parents in Kleinwittenberg and Piesteritz, both districts of Lutherstadt Wittenberg. After a non-self contained vocational training as a plumber, he was a laborer at different chemical laboratories in and around Wittenberg. He would become a member of the Freien deutsche Jugend (Free German Youth) in 1918, then the Communist Party of Germany (KPD) in 1921 and then a co-founder of the Association of Proletarian-Revolutionary Authors in 1928. He wrote for the KPD newspaper Klassenkampf (Class Struggle) in Halle and Die Rote Fahne after 1927. He was sacked from the Nitrogen factory in Piesteritz for political agitation and remained jobless until 1933. His exclusion from the KPD in 1931 because of violation of party lines that would be annulled in 1945. In 1932 he joined the Communist Party of Germany (Opposition). Because of anti-fascist resistance and contacts to the group Weise, he would be in a concentration camp in 1933 and 1934, then the Zuchthaus and Emslandlager, after which he was a laborer under Gestapo supervision.

From 8 May 1945 until 31 July 1950, Lorbeer was mayor of Piesteritz and then a freelance writer until his death.

Hans Lorbeer was a member of the Akademie der Künste. For his literary works, he was awarded the 1959 Heinrich Mann Prize, the 1961 National Prize of East Germany, the 1963 Mündel Prize of the Halle Bezirk and the 1971 Lion Feuchtwanger Prize, as well as the gold Patriotic Order of Merit and the Order of the Banner of Labor. On 8 August 1976 the city government of Lutherstadt Wittenberg agreed that Hans Lorbeer would be named an honorary citizen of the City. On the basis of the then legally valid position, he is viewed as the last Honorary Citizen of that city.

== Works ==
A representative selection of Lorbeer's poetic writings offered in the volume Chronik in Versen. Gedichte aus fünf Jahrzehnten had appeared in the 1971 Mitteldeutschen Verlag as a piece of Lorbeer's Gesammelten Werken in Einzelausgaben.

=== Novels ===
- Ein Mensch wird geprügelt (A Man is Beaten), Moscow 1930 (Russian), 1959
- Die Sieben ist eine gute Zahl (Seven is a Good Number), 1953
- Die Rebellen von Wittenberg (The Rebels of Wittenberg), Volume I (Das Fegefeuer) 1956, Volume II (Der Widerruf) 1959, Volume III (Die Obrigkeit) 1963
- Der Spinner (The Spider)

=== Stories ===
- Wacht auf! (Wake Up!), Berlin 1928
- Die Legende vom Soldaten Daniel (The Legend of the Soldier Daniel), 1948
- Vorfrühling und andere Liebesgeschichten (Early Spring and Other Life Histories), 1953
- Der Birkenhügel. Liebesgeschichten (The Birch Hill. Life Histories), Halle 1960
- Zur freundlichen Erinnerung (Of Friendly Memories), 1960
- Ein Leben lang (A Life Long), 1974

=== Poems ===
- Gedichte eines jungen Arbeiters (Poems of a Young Worker), 1925
- Die Gitterharfe (The Rail Harp), 1948
- Des Tages Lied (The Daily Song), 1948
- Es singt ein Mensch auf allen Strassen (It Sings a People From all Streets), 1950
- Als du siebenunddreißig warst (When you were thirty-seven), 1961
- Die Straßen gehen (The Streets go), 1961
- Chronik in Versen (Chronicle in Verses), 1971

=== Dramas ===
- Die Trinker, 1925
- Liebknecht- Luxemburg- Lenin, 1927
- Panzerkreuzer Potemkin, 1929
- Phosphor, Leningrad 1931

== Literature ==
- Walther Killy: Literatur Lexikon. Bertelsmann Lexikon Verlag, Gütersloh/München 1990
- Christa Johannsen: Lutherstadt Wittenberg zwischen Gestern und Morgen. Union Verlag Berlin 1967
- Dieter Heinemann: "Hans Lorbeer", in: Literatur der DDR, Volume 3, Verlag Volk und Wissen, Berlin 1987
- Rüdiger Reinecke: "Widerstand Schreiben. Hans Lorbeer nach 1933". In: Wolfgang Asholt, Rüdiger Reinecke, Erhard Schütz, Hendrik Weber (Editor.): Unruhe und Engagement. Blicköffnungen für das Andere. Festschrift für Walter Fähnders zum 60. Geburtstag. Bielefeld: Aisthesis, 2004
