= Erika Heymann =

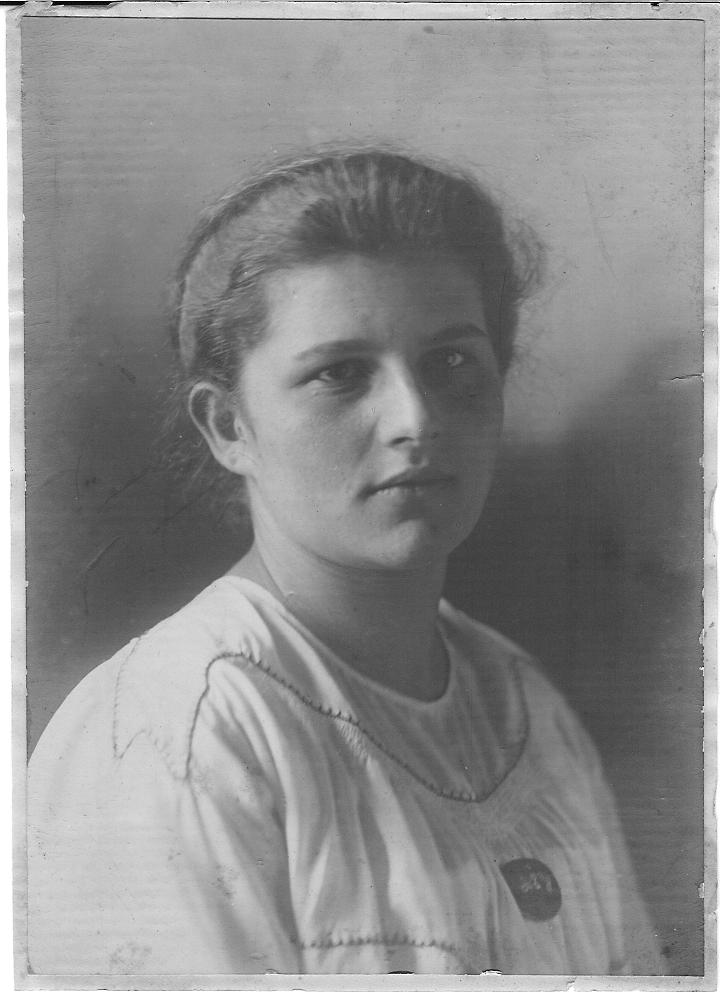
Erika Heymann, circa 1919

Erika Heymann (née Erika Lasallelie Geck; German: [ˈeː.ʁi.ka ˈhaɪˌ̯man]; Offenburg, Germany, 1895 – Amsterdam, 6 April 1950) was a German woman posthumously granted the status of Righteous Among the Nations by Yad Vashem for helping several Jews hide during the German occupation of the Netherlands.

== Early life ==
Erika Geck was born in Offenburg, Germany in 1895. She was the daughter of Adolf and Marie Geck, the third of five children. Her father was a socialist and her mother a Catholic. She was not particularly religious and thought of herself as a lover of nature (naturfreunde in German).

In 1921, Erika Geck married Stefan Heymann, a veteran of the German Army in World War I and a communist. The couple lived in Mannheim, were active in civic and labor union affairs, and contributed articles for the communist daily on topics ranging from politics to the performing arts. Two children were born to the couple at this time: Sonja in 1922 and Dieter in 1927.

== Berlin ==
In 1930, Stefan took a job with the communist newspaper Rote Fahne (Red Flag) as its editor in Berlin. In 1933, Stefan was imprisoned in Wohlau for refusing to divulge the author of an article that had appeared in Rote Fahne.

Shortly thereafter, she received an order from the Interior Minister of Prussia, Hermann Göring, evicting the family from Prussia. Under the Weimar Republic, Erika was a citizen of the state of Baden, and could therefore be ordered to leave Prussia. Erika and Stefan (from prison) agreed it was time to leave Germany entirely.

Erika's sister, Traudel, convinced the director of the transportation labor union (ITF) in Amsterdam to hire Erika as a governess, on the pretext that she would teach German to his children. On 14 July 1933 the family moved to Amsterdam.

The three lived at Argonautenstraat 19 in the south of Amsterdam, renting two apartments, one of which they sublet. Erika worked as a cook and cleaning woman during the day. She also made contacts in the socialist movements in Amsterdam.

In March 1936, Stefan completed his sentence, but was rearrested for being a member of the KPD and sentenced to life imprisonment in the Kislau concentration camp. In 1938, he was transferred to Dachau to help build a new prison camp. Stefan and Erika maintained some correspondence, but as war drew near, this became increasingly difficult.

== War and occupation ==
In May 1940, Germany invaded and occupied the Netherlands. Erika was summoned to SD headquarters. There she was told that if she divorced her Jewish husband, she would get a good job. She refused, however, and destroyed all her correspondence with Stefan.

The defeat of the German army at Stalingrad accelerated the persecution of Jews in occupied Europe. Erika took in several people she knew to be Jewish to live at the house: Erwin Geismar, Abraham "Appie" Keizer, and Hendrik "Henkie" Westermans, whose real name was Chanan Floersheim.

After the war, the Dutch resistance organization "Vrije Groupen Amsterdam" (VGA) issued a certificate that Erika had participated in various underground activities during the occupation.

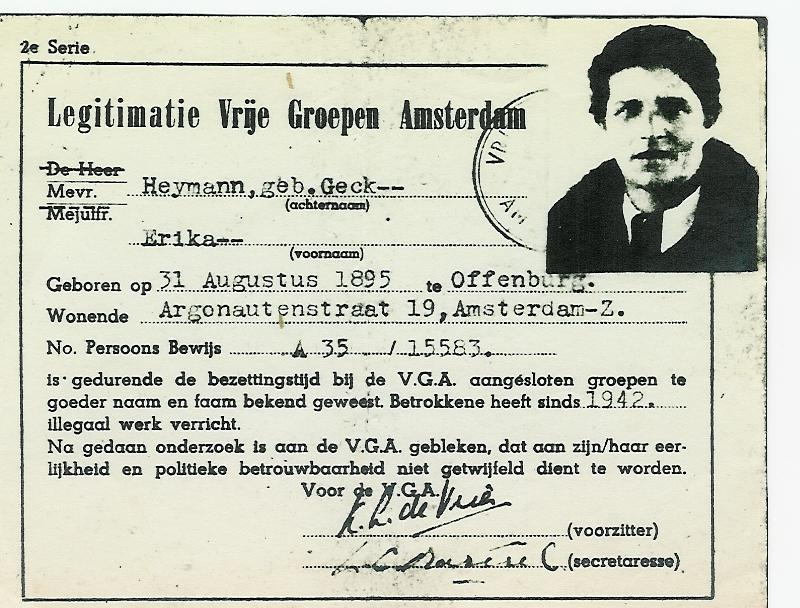
Erika Heymann's VGA Certificate

== Arrest and imprisonment ==
On 4 September 1943 Floersheim's relatives the Polaks (Frits, Berni and Ilse) arrived at the house at his suggestion because they had been forced to leave the place they were hiding. The next day, German police, acting on a tip, raided the house, arresting the Polaks, Erwin Geismar, and Erika Heymann. Appie Keizer was away. Floersheim was there, but managed to escape across a balcony. Erika's children were not at home and were able to stay at the Argonautenstraat for the rest of the war.

The Polaks and Mr Geismar almost certainly perished in the concentration camps. Appie Keizer hid elsewhere for the rest of the war. Chanan Floersheim escaped through Belgium and France into Spain, where he remained until 1944, eventually moving to British-controlled Palestine.

Erika Heymann was sentenced to confinement through the end of the war for the crime of Judenhilfe, aiding Jews. She was soon transferred to the concentration camp at Vught. At Vught she was made to work sorting and repairing stolen clothes. She was then moved to a factory where inmates assembled gas masks for the German Army. She developed leukemia, for which exposure to benzene is a known cause.

Erika was at Vught during the Bunker Tragedy of January 1944, during which 74 women were ordered by the camp commander into a cell measuring about 9 square meters. Ten women died of asphyxiation. She had tried to avert the action that led to this tragedy, but as she was German and most of the prisoners were Dutch, her advice was ignored. She was released from Vught in 1944 on Hitler's birthday. A Dutch neurosurgeon who had assisted in removing a bullet from the brain of a high German officer was allowed to submit a list of prisoners to be released from Vught. Erika's name was placed on that list.

== Post-war and death ==
Erika was reunited with her children upon her release. She was weak from her camp experience, and stayed at the house for most of the remaining year of the occupation.

Stefan Heymann was a prisoner at Buchenwald when it was liberated in 1945. Erika and Stefan did not reunite after the war, as Stefan wanted the family to move to the Soviet-occupied zone of Germany, but the children wanted to stay in the Netherlands.

Erika's leukemia worsened and she died on 6 April 1950. Dieter and Sonja scattered her ashes in the North Sea.

== Righteous Among the Nations ==
Dieter Heymann and Chanan Floersheim became reacquainted in 2003. The Heymann family, at Floersheim's suggestion, applied to Yad Vashem to have Erika declared one of the "Righteous Among the Nations"; this was granted in 2010. The award was presented at the Holocaust Museum Houston in 2011; Chanan Floersheim flew from Israel to Houston for the ceremony.

Erika Heymann is survived by her son Dieter, his three children and four grandchildren, and by the three children and seven grandchildren of her daughter Sonja, who died in 2012.
