= Elfriede Brüning =

German journalist and novelist

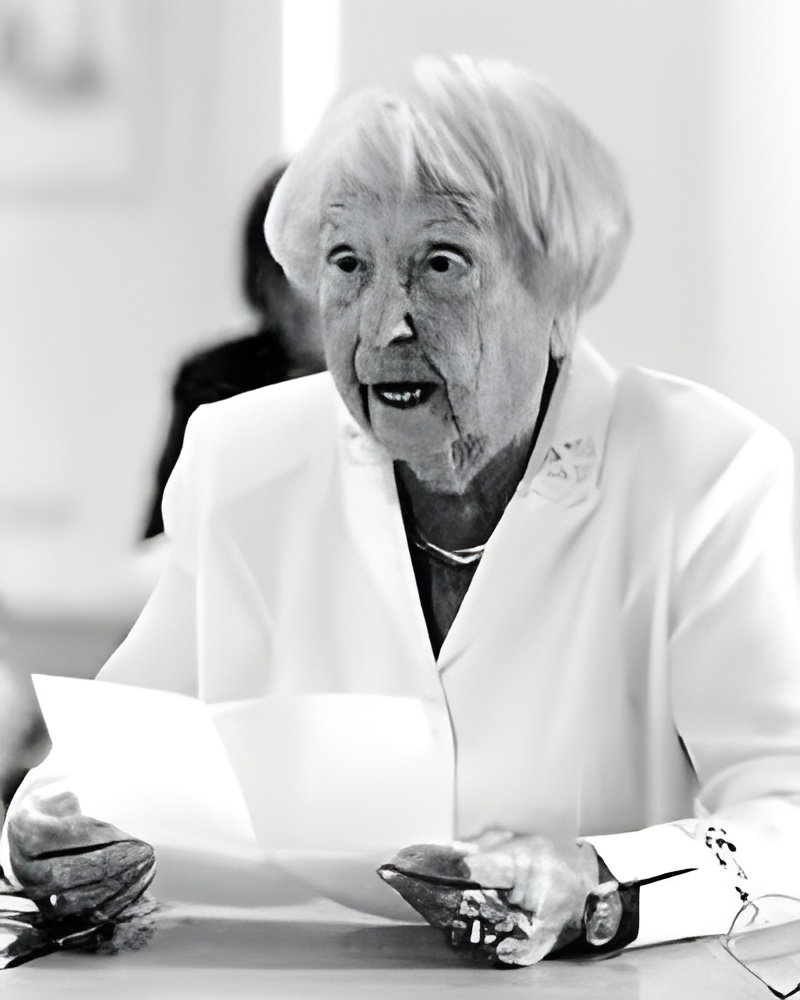
- Born: November 8, 1910; Berlin, Kingdom of Prussia, German Empire
- Died: August 5, 2014 (aged 103); Berlin, Germany
- Resting place: Dorotheenstadt Cemetery
- Education: MASCH
- Partner: Joachim Barckhausen
- Children: Christiane Barckhausen
- Writing career
- Pen name: Elke Klent
- Literary movement: Communism

Elfriede Brüning (8 November 1910 – 5 August 2014) was a German communist journalist and novelist. She also used the pseudonym Elke Klent.

== Life and career ==
Elfriede Brüning was born in Berlin, the daughter of a cabinetmaker and a seamstress who were involved in the workers' movement. Forced to leave school after the tenth year to help support the family, she worked in offices; beginning in 1929, she was a secretary at a Berlin film company. After forging a letter of recommendation, she began to publish articles in the Feuilleton sections of newspapers such as the Berliner Tageblatt, the Berliner Börsen-Courier and the Vossische Zeitung. After attending a Marxist Workers' School, she joined the Communist Party (KPD) in 1930 and thereafter wrote mainly for the Communist press. In 1932 she joined the Association of Proletarian-Revolutionary Authors; then the youngest in her branch, she was to be the last surviving member. Her first novel, Handwerk hat goldenen Boden, was a social criticism and was to be published in 1933 but was not because of the Nazi seizure of power; it appeared in 1970 under the title Kleine Leute. Brüning turned to lighter reading and in 1934 published Und außerdem ist Sommer, which was a success.

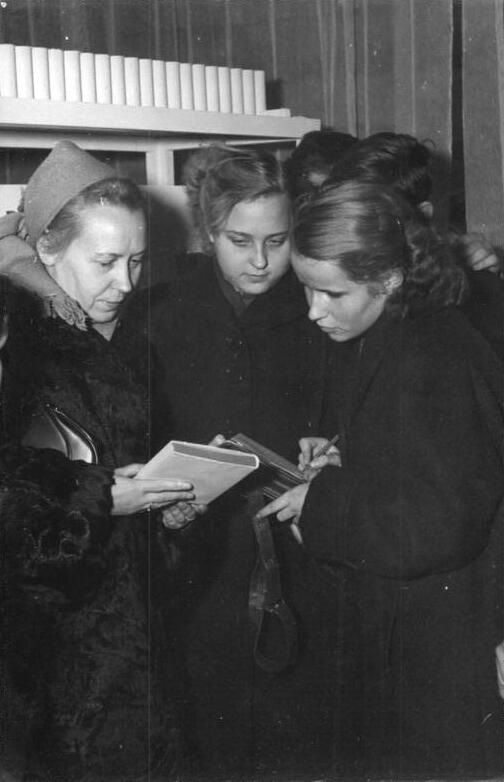
Brüning (left) in 1953

During the early years of the Nazi régime, Brüning participated in the Communist resistance, writing for the exile newspaper Neue Deutsche Blätter under the pseudonym Elke Klent and making trips to Prague, where it was published, as a courier for the Association of Proletarian-Revolutionary Authors. The KPD's illegal central committee met in the flat at her parents' shop. On 12 October 1935 she was arrested and imprisoned in the Barnimstrasse women's prison, but was released after her trial for treason in 1937, since the Gestapo was unable to prove she had engaged in illegal activities. She was able to obtain permission to write in prison, so in 1936 she published another novel, Junges Herz muß wandern.

In 1937 she married Joachim Barckhausen, a writer and editor; their daughter Christiane Barckhausen, born in 1942, also became a writer. Brüning worked as a script evaluator for a film company and with Barckhausen co-wrote the scenario for Semmelweis – Retter der Mütter, which was filmed by DEFA after the war. She spent the last years of the war on her in-laws' estate in the Magdeburg Börde.

Brüning returned to Berlin in 1946, reactivated her KPD membership, and wrote for and edited news periodicals in what later became the German Democratic Republic. Her marriage ended in 1948. From 1950 on, she was self-employed as a writer and lived in Berlin. After German reunification she became a member of The Left. She continued to give interviews into her old age.

She died in Berlin and was buried in the Dorotheenstadt cemetery. Her papers for the years 1930–2007 are in the Fritz Hüser Institute in Dortmund.

== Selected honours ==
- 1960: Patriotic Order of Merit in Bronze
- 1975: Patriotic Order of Merit in Silver
- 1980: Goethe Prize of the City of Berlin
- 1980: Literature Prize of the Democratic Women's League of Germany
- 1983: Art Prize of the Free German Trade Union Federation
- 1985: Patriotic Order of Merit in Gold

== Works ==
Brüning's publications include novels, short stories, journalism and television scripts. Her novels often have an autobiographical element; they usually concern women's lives and even the four she published under the Nazis have female protagonists who are determined to go against the party line by pursuing careers. They were popular in East Germany; by her 103rd birthday in 2013, a million and a half copies had been printed. But especially in the 1950s, she was officially attacked as "petty bourgeois" for her themes of women seeking equality in marriage, and her work was insufficiently optimistic for official tastes. Although often nominated, she did not receive the most prestigious East German prizes, the Literature Prize of the Democratic Women's League of Germany and Art Prize of the Free German Trade Union Federation, until the 1980s, when she was in her seventies. After reunification she continued to write about social injustices, including those of the reunification.

- Und außerdem ist Sommer, Leipzig 1934
- Junges Herz muß wandern, Berlin 1936
- Auf schmalem Land, Leipzig 1938
- … damit du weiterlebst, Berlin 1949
- Die Umkehr. Das ist Agnes, Leipzig 1949
- Ein Kind für mich allein, Leipzig 1950
- Vor uns das Leben, Berlin 1952
- Regine Haberkorn, Berlin 1955
- Gabriele, Berlin 1956
- Rom hauptpostlagernd, Berlin 1958
- Sonntag der dreizehnte, Berlin 1960
- Wege und Schicksale, Berlin 1962
- Das Antlitz unserer Zeit, Berlin 1965
- Kinder ohne Eltern, Halle 1968
- Kleine Leute, Berlin 1970
- Septemberreise, Halle 1974
- Hochverrat, Berlin 1975
- Jasmina und die Lotosblume, Berlin 1976
- Zu meiner Zeit, Halle 1977
- Partnerinnen, Halle 1978
- Frauenschicksale, Halle 1981
- Wie andere Leute auch, Halle 1983
- Altweiberspiele und andere Geschichten, Halle 1986
- Lästige Zeugen?, Halle 1990
- Kinder im Kreidekreis, Berlin 1992
- Und außerdem war es mein Leben, Berlin 1994 (autobiography)
- Jeder lebt für sich allein, Berlin 1999
- Spätlese, short stories, Berlin: Dietz, 2000, ISBN 3-320-02004-8; Berlin: Verlag am Park, 2014, ISBN 978-3-89793-195-4.
- Ein Mädchen und zwei Romane, Rostock: BS, 2002, ISBN 3-89954-002-6
- Zeit-Besichtigung, Wilhelmshorst 2003
- Gefährtinnen, Berlin 2004
- Gedankensplitter, Berlin 2006
- 40 Kunstwerke aus der DDR, (Ed.), Berlin: Das Neue Berlin, 2009, ISBN 978-3-355-01765-7
- Nun, ich lebe noch. Deutsche Kommunistinnen in sowjetischen Lagern. Tonbandgespräche, Edition Ost, Berlin: Verlag am Park, 2013, ISBN 978-3-89793-291-3.
