= Association of Proletarian-Revolutionary Authors =

German cultural organisation

- Bund proletarisch-revolutionärer Schriftsteller
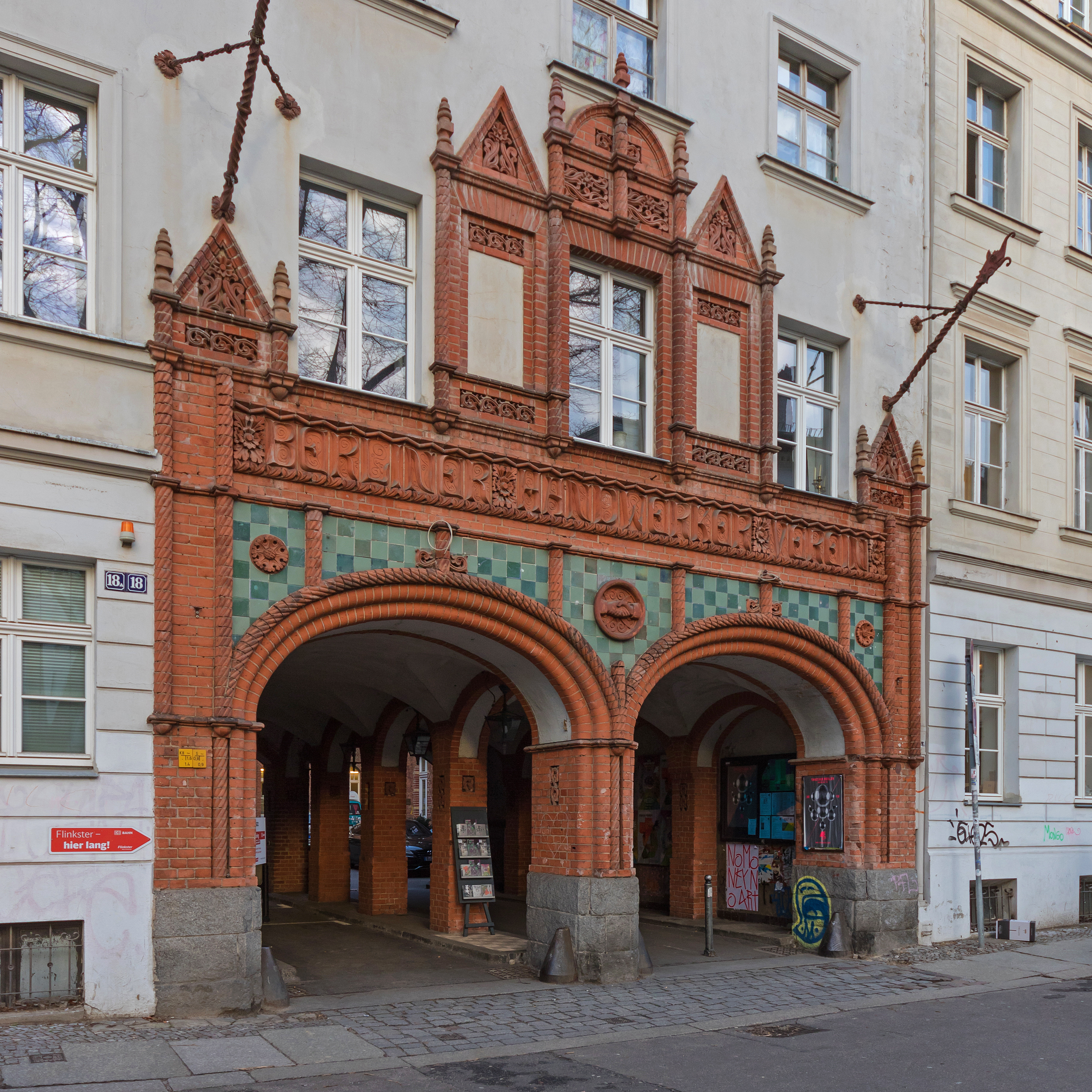
- Founding location of the Association
- Founders: Julian Borchardt; Egon Kisch; Berta Lask; Hans Lorbeer; Ludwig Renn; Anna Seghers; Erich Weinert
- Founded at: Scheunenviertel, Berlin
- Location: Weimar Republic
- Publication: Die Linkskurve

The Association of Proletarian-Revolutionary Authors (German: Bund proletarisch-revolutionärer Schriftsteller, BPRS) was a German cultural organisation established in 1928, at the time of the Weimar Republic. It was close to the Communist Party of Germany and published a magazine called Die Linkskurve.

Its members were divided into two groups: the so-called "bourgeois writers" and the so-called '"proletarian writers". The confrontation between the two groups led to a fierce struggle for power within the association, but also to a lively and fruitful cultural debate about the role and form of literature, in the attempt to overcome the 19th century bourgeois models and create a new "revolutionary" model. Important intellectuals of the time took part in the debate, such as Gyorgy Lukács, who was later to contribute to the development of Socialist realism.

The last issue of Die Linkskurve appeared in January 1933. After the Nazis took over power, the association still existed for some time, also in Prague, Paris, Wien, and Switzerland.

== Prominent members ==
- Bruno Apitz
- Erich Arendt
- Theodor Balk
- Johannes R. Becher
- Hertha Block
- Herbert Bochow
- Julian Borchardt (founding member)
- Willi Bredel
- Elfriede Brüning
- Albert Daudistel (excluded 20 May 1930)
- Andor Gábor
- Karl Grünberg
- Willy Harzheim
- Kurt Kläber
- Egon Erwin Kisch (founding member)
- Jan Koplowitz
- Berta Lask (founding member)
- Maria Leitner
- Hans Lorbeer (founding member)
- Hans Marchwitza
- Klaus Neukrantz
- Ernst Ottwalt
- Jan Petersen
- Erwin Piscator
- Paul Polte alias Peter Polter
- Ludwig Renn (founding member)
- Trude Richter
- Frida Rubiner
- Anna Seghers (founding member)
- Alexander Graf Stenbock-Fermor
- Bernhard and Charlotte Temming
- Berta Waterstradt
- Erich Weinert (founding member)
- Franz Carl Weiskopf
- Helmut Weiß alias Hans Wendt (Bremen)
- Karl August Wittfogel
- Friedrich Wolf
- Carl Wüsthoff
- Max Zimmering
- Hermynia Zur Mühlen

== See also ==
- Russian Association of Proletarian Writers
- Union of Soviet Writers
- League of American Writers
- Chinese Writers Association
