= László Radványi =

Sociologist and economist from Germany

László Radványi (13 December 1900 — 3 July 1978), also known as Johann-Lorenz Schmidt, was a Hungarian-German economist and academic.

== Life ==
=== Childhood and early career ===
Radványi was born into a Jewish family in Hungary. As a boy, Radványi attended a grammar school on Marko Street in Budapest. While attending grammar school, at the age of 16, he authored a book of poetry, which received a preface from Frigyes Karinthy. Radványi studied economics and philosophy at the University of Budapest from 1918 to 1919, where he became involved in radical politics. With the destruction of the Hungarian Soviet Republic in 1919 he fled to Vienna, where he adopted the pseudonym "Johann Lorenz Schmidt", from the 18th-century Protestant dissident theologian. Radványi studied philosophy in Germany at Heidelberg University, where he obtained his doctorate in 1923. Directed by Karl Jaspers, his thesis on Chiliasm was summa cum laude. While at Heidelberg, Radványi met the writer Anna Seghers. They married in 1925 and had two children, Pierre (b. 1926) and Ruth (b. 1928).

=== Berlin and Paris ===
After finishing their studies at Heidelberg, Radványi and Seghers moved to Berlin, where Radványi directed the Marxistische Arbeiterschule (Marxist Workers School) from 1925 to 1933. Radványi gathered faculty members such as Georg Lukács and Bertolt Brecht, and speakers such as Albert Einstein, who in 1931 hosted a conference titled "What a worker must know about the Theory of Relativity". László indicated in his letters in 1926 the impossibility of obtaining a job as a philosophy professor in Germany because of his "Hungarian-ness and Jewishness". The German government closed the Marxistische Arbeiterschule in 1933, and Radványi then left for Paris. In Paris, Radványi founded and directed the Freie Deutsche Hochschule (Free German University), however, the German invasion of Paris forced Radványi to abandon his new endeavour. In 1940, the police in Meudon detained him as a citizen of a country allied with Germany. He was interned in the Camp du Vernet in Ariège. In December 1940, Seghers obtained a visa for herself, her husband, and their children with the help of Karl Mannheim. The family did not leave France until 24 March 1941, after they had received a transit visa from the United States; they arrived in New York on 16 June 1941. They departed on 25 June 1941 aboard the SS Monterrey. The SS Monterey's manifest of passengers also included the French anthropologist Claude Lévi-Strauss and surrealistic writer André Breton for New York City and the port of Veracruz, in the Gulf of Mexico.

=== Mexico, final years and death ===
Radványi and his family arrived in Mexico on 30 June 1941. In Mexico City, the family had an audience in the National Palace with the new president, General Manuel Ávila Camacho. Radványi got a job at a local newspaper. Vicente Lombardo Toledano, the leader of the Mexican labor movement, asked Radványi to join the recently created Universidad Obrera de México (Workers' University of Mexico) and teach Marxist history and economics. In 1944, Radványi took a position at the National University of Mexico. Here, he developed an interest for propaganda studies and opinion research, becoming the editor of the short-lived Journal of Opinion and Attitude Research. Radványi left Mexico in 1952 for the German Democratic Republic where he taught at Humboldt University of Berlin. In 1955, Radványi and his family moved to Volkswohlstraße 81 (later Anna-Seghers-Straße), in East Berlin. On 3 July 1978 he died and was buried in the Dorotheenstadt cemetery, where his wife was also buried when she died in 1983. In 2007, Radványi's archives were deposited, though not organized, at Humboldt University.

== Works ==
- Der Chiliasmus: ein Versuch zur Erkenntnis der chiliastischen Idee und des chiliastischen Handelns. Budapest: Lukács Archívum 1985. Dissertation Heidelberg 1923.
- Probleme des Neokolonialismus: die Besonderheiten des westdeutschen Neokolonialismus. Berlin: Akademie-Verlag 1963.
- Die Entwicklungsländer: Ursprung, Lage, Perspektive. Berlin: Verlag Die Wirtschaft 1974.
- Internationale Konzerne. Berlin: Verlag Die Wirtschaft 1981.
- Probleme des kapitalistischen Weltmarktes. Herausgeber: J. L. Schmidt, K. H. Domdey. (Redaktionskollegium: J. L. Schmidt, K. H. Domdey, S. Wenger.) 1958
