= Erich Arendt =

German poet and translator

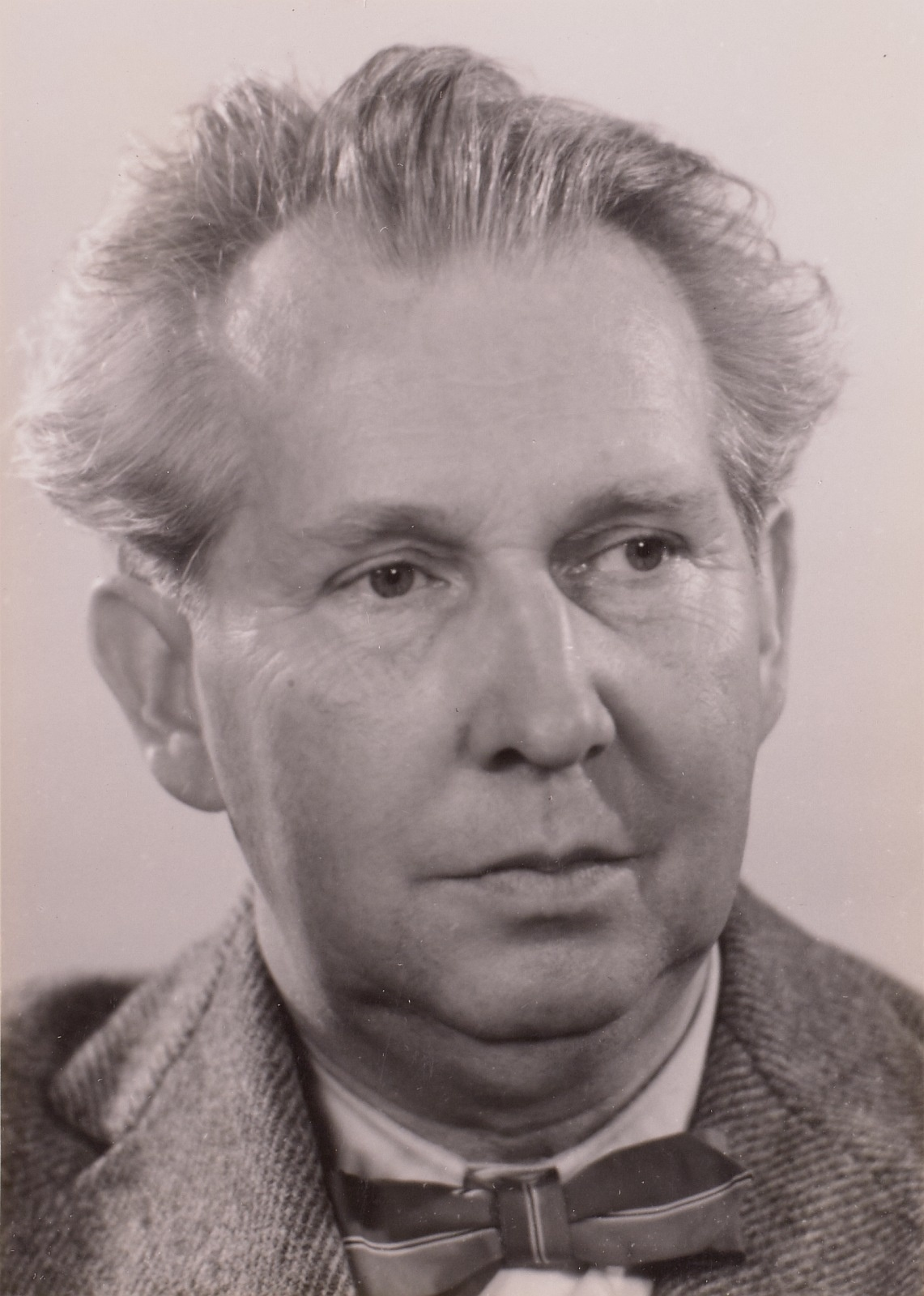
Arendt in Berlin, 1956.

Erich Otto Reinhold Arendt (15 April 1903 – 25 September 1984) was a German poet and translator.

== Biography ==
He was born into a working family of a school janitor. In his youth, he changed many professions, he worked as an agricultural worker, a theater set designer, a bank clerk, a journalist and a teacher in an experimental school.

In 1926 he became a member of the German Communist Party and from 1928 he was a member of the Association of Proletarian-Revolutionary Authors.

He published his early poetry in the expressionist literary magazine Der Sturm. He made long trips to Germany, Switzerland, France and Spain.

After the Nazi seizure of power in Germany, Arendt who was a Communist and the husband of a half-Jewish woman, emigrated to Switzerland. From 1933 to 1950 he lived in exile. He participated in the Spanish Civil War and fought as part of the International Brigades. Then in 1940 he emigrated through France to Colombia, where he spent almost ten years in Indian settlements. In 1950 he moved to East Germany. Upon returning, he attempted to join the ruling SED, however this was denied and Arendt was under constant supervision.

He was a member of the Academy of Arts of East Germany.

Erich Arendt died after a stroke. He was buried at the Dorotheenstadt Cemetery in Berlin.

== Selected works ==
- Trug doch die Nacht den Albatros. Rütten & Loening, Berlin 1951
- Bergwindballade. Gedichte des spanischen Freiheitskampfes. Dietz, Berlin 1952
- Über Asche und Zeit... Volk und Welt, Berlin 1957
- Gesang der sieben Inseln. Rütten & Loening, Berlin 1957
- Flug-Oden., Leipzig 1959
- Unter den Hufen des Winds. Ausgewählte Gedichte 1926–1965. Rowohlt, Reinbek 1966
- Ägäis. Insel, Leipzig 1967
- Aus fünf Jahrzehnten. Auswahl von Heinz Czechowski. Hinstorff, Rostock 1968
- Gedichte. Auswahl von Gerhard Wolf. Reclam, Leipzig 1973
- Feuerhalm. Insel, Leipzig 1973 (IB 986/1)
- Memento und Bild. Insel, Leipzig 1976
- Zeitsaum. Insel, Leipzig 1978
- Starrend von Zeit und Helle. Gedichte der Ägäis. Reclam, Leipzig 1980
- Entgrenzen. Insel, Leipzig 1981
