= Trude Richter =

German writer and political activist (1899–1989)

- Born: Erna Johanna Marie Barnick; 19 November 1899; Magdeburg, Province of Saxony, Prussia, German Empire
- Died: January 4, 1989 (aged 89); Leipzig, Bezirk Leipzig, East Germany
- Occupation: Writer
- Political party: KPD; SED
- Partner: Hans Günther

Trude Richter (born Erna Johanna Marie Barnick in Magdeburg 19 November 1899 – died Leipzig 4 January 1989) was a writer, literary scholar and teacher who became a political activist. She spent many years detained in labour camps in the Soviet Union, but she remained a committed Communist throughout her life.

She received the name by which she is known, Trude Richter, neither by birth or marriage. The name Trude Richter was conferred on her, originally as a cover name, in January 1931 when she joined the Association of Proletarian-Revolutionary Authors ("Bund Proletarisch-Revolutionärer Schriftsteller"), an organisation with close connections to the German Communist Party, of which Richter was also a member.

== Life ==
Erna Barnick was born at the tail end of the nineteenth century in Magdeburg, then in northern central Germany. Her father was a senior official locally with the postal service. She attended an academically focused school in Danzig and then trained to become a teacher, taking a teaching job in 1919 on the island of Poel, a short distance along the coast to the east of Hamburg. Between 1920 and 1924 she undertook a university course at Berlin and, from 1923, Frankfurt am Main, studying philosophy, history, theology and a wide-ranging German studies course that included history of art. She received her doctorate in 1924, and in the same year took a post as a school teacher. She undertook further teacher training during 1924–1926 emerging with a full qualification for teaching German Studies and History at academic secondary level. She also became involved in a Communist student group in connection with which she undertook several trips abroad.

From 1926/27 Barnick lived in partnership with the writer and Marxist economist/sociologist academic Hans Günther (1899–1938). In 1930 or 1931 she joined the Communist Party, and in 1931 she relocated from the north to Berlin. In January 1931 she joined the Association of Proletarian-Revolutionary Authors, becoming the association's First Secretary in 1932 on the recommendation of Johannes R. Becher who had been a co-founder of it. At the same time, Trude Richter, as she later became known, continued with her teaching career, now in Berlin-Wilmersdorf. She began to use the name "Trude Richter" for her contributions to the Frankfurt "Workers' Newspaper" ("Arbeiterzeitung") in order to be able to continue with her teaching work, in respect of which she was a state employee.

In January 1933 the NSDAP (Nazi party) took power and lost little time in establishing a one-party state in Germany. Membership of political parties (other than of the Nazi party) was banned which meant that political activities undertaken on behalf of the Communist Party became illegal. Richter nevertheless continued her political resistance work under the new regime. She helped to hide people whom state agencies wished to persecute, undertook courier work between Berlin and Prague and contributed material for illegal publications until April 1934, when she emigrated, initially to Prague and from there to the Soviet Union. Her partner, Hans Günther, was by now already there and was working at the Communist Academy and as a writer. In Moscow Trude Richter was able to complete her post-doctoral dissertation and taught at the Moscow Pedagogical for modern languages. During the next couple of years she pursued her teaching career and produced at least one text-book for language teaching. On 3 November 1936 she took Soviet citizenship; the next day, on 4 November 1936, Richter and her partner Hans Günther were both arrested and placed in pretrial detention. No trial took place but at the end of 1937 she was nevertheless sentenced to five years of detention in one of the Gulag Labor camps and a lifetime ban. In fact, she had been expelled from the Communist Party in January 1937, a couple of months after her initial detention. Grounds for her sentencing were recorded as [alleged] Counter-revolutionary and Trotskyite activities. On 17 August 1938, she was transferred to the Kolyma concentration camp region in the eastern interior of the Soviet Union, first in the North East "Ispravitel'no-trudovoj" Rehabilitation Camp and then in the "Teka" "Ispravitel'no-trudovoj" Dalstroy Rehabilitation Camp. Richter's partner, Hans Günther, also found himself taken to the Kolyma region, but died from Typhus on 10 November 1938 in a transit camp at Vladivostok.

Trude Richter: Some published works
- Das Volksbuch von Barbarossa und Geschichten von Kaiser Friedrich dem Anderen, Jena 1925
- Kaiser Friedrich Barbarossa in der Geschichte, Jena 1926
- Die bildende Kunst im Rahmen der Deutschkunde, Berlin 1927
- Gerhart Hauptmanns Erzähltechnik, Bamberg ohne Jahresangabe
- Literaturgeschichtliches Lesebuch, Charkow 1934
- Über den sozialistischen Realismus, Referentenmaterial, Sektion Kunst und Literatur, 1958
- Das Glück des Bitteren, Halle (Saale) 1969
- Die Plakette, Halle (Saale) 1972
- Totgesagt, Gesamtausgabe, 1990 (postum)

Trude Richter was released from her detention on 14 September 1946 but she would remain in the eastern part of the Soviet Union till 1953. Between 1946 and 1949 she was employed as a cloakroom attendant at the Gorki Theatre in Magadan where she was also able to help out with the stage sets and in the orchestra.

On 23 August 1949 she was rearrested, her party membership ban was again invoked, and she was deported to Ust-Omchug which was the Gulag administrative centre for the Tenka rehabilitation camps. Here she was assigned to the mining administration division. It was around this time that Trude Richter attempted to hang herself but survived because the rope snapped. Between 1950 and 1953 she was given work playing the piano in the culture club and taught foreign languages as part of an adult education programme. In 1953 she was released from Ust-Omchug. She was able to move back to Magadan where she returned to work at the theatre. Her formal political rehabilitation by the Soviet Supreme Court was completed in 1956/57 after the well-regarded German writers Anna Seghers and Johannes Becher had intervened on her behalf. It was also with the help of Ann Seghers that she was permitted to leave Magadan and, after an absence of more than twenty years, return to what had been central Germany and had by now become the German Democratic Republic where she started a new life in the south of the new country, in Leipzig.

Between 1957 and 1966 she taught at the city's Johannes R. Becher Institute for Literature (as it was known at that time). Here she would later be remembered as a mentor for a younger generation of writers including Hans Weber (1937–1987) and Horst Salomon (1929–1972). She published contributions to the socialist literary canon on her own and had already begun, in the 1960s, to write down her experiences in the Soviet prison camps. In 1972 she published the first volume of her memoirs under the title "The Badge" ("Die Plakette"). However, publication of her complete memoirs, including her periods in detention, was not initially permitted in East Germany. Her full autobiography appeared posthumously under the title "Said to be dead" ("Totgesagt") in 1990.

In 1987 Trude Richter became a member of the East German Writers' Association.
