= Maria Leitner =

Hungarian writer and journalist (1892–1942)

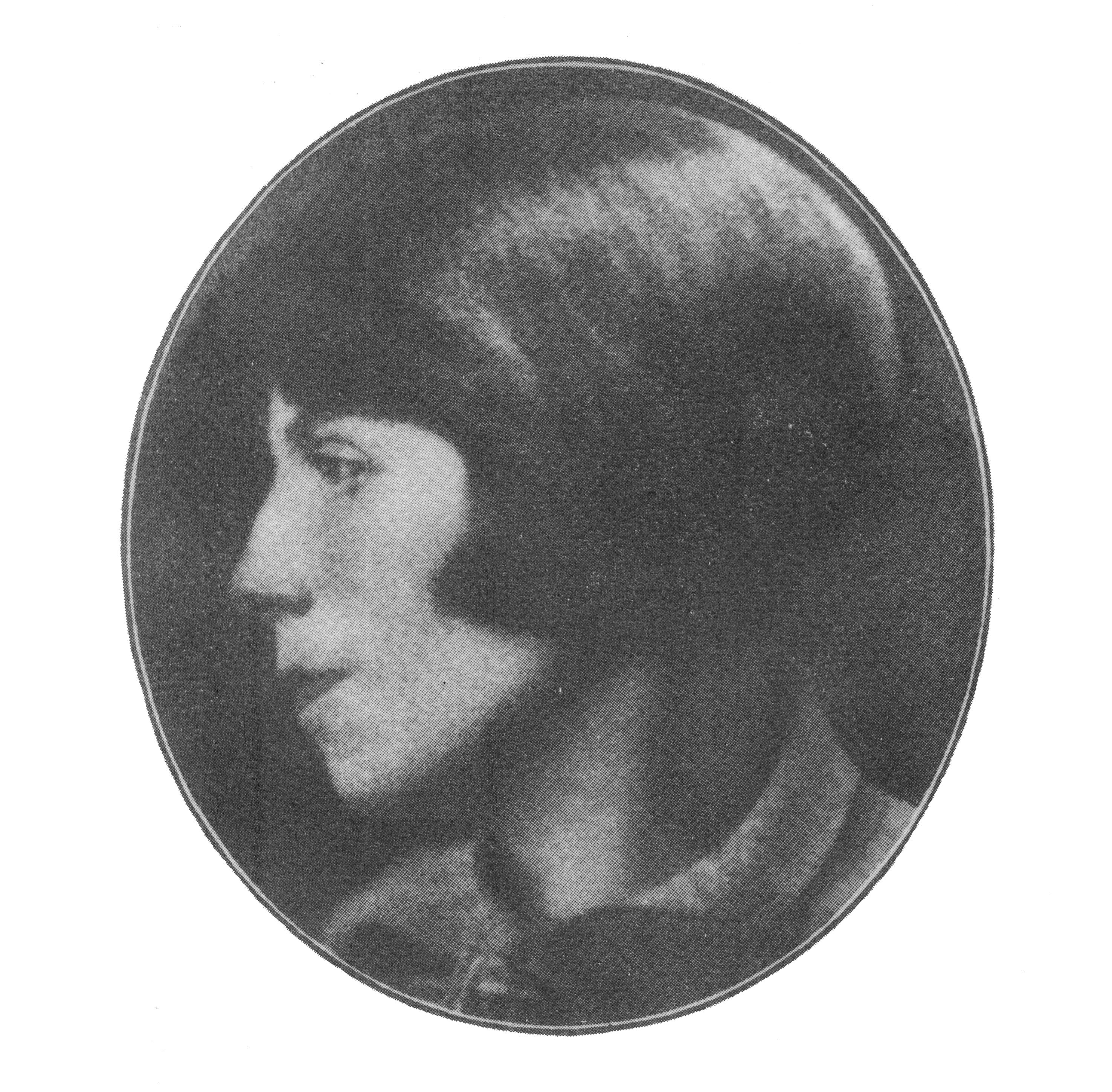
Maria Leitner

Maria Leitner (19 January 1892 – 14 March 1942) was a Hungarian writer and journalist in the German language. She is remembered as a pioneer of "undercover reporting".

== Early years ==
Maria Leitner came from a bilingual Jewish family. She was born, the eldest of her parents' three recorded children, on 19 January 1892 in Varaždin, Austria-Hungary, today in Croatia. Her father, Leopold Leitner, ran a small building business. In 1896 the family relocated to Budapest where she grew up and attended "The Royal Senior Girls' School" between 1902 and 1910. It was probably here that she learned both her English and her French. She then studied art history in Vienna and Berlin, completing an internship in Paul Cassirer's Berlin gallery which resulted in a translation into German of William Hogarth's "Aufzeichnungen" (loosely: "notes")

== Career ==
From 1913, she worked for the newspaper Az Est ("Evening"). After war broke out in the summer of 1914 she worked as a reporter – at one stage reporting for the Budapest newspapers from Stockholm. In 1920, she fled from Hungary to Germany because of her left-wing anti-militarist activities. In Germany, she wrote for various newspapers, and books reviews for the publishing house Ullstein. In her book Hotel Amerika, she describes poor America from within. As a result, she was a hired as a cleaning lady in luxury hotels. Her work was thus connected with the literary current of the Neue Sachlichkeit ("New Objectivity"), in vogue in the Weimar Republic.

In 1933, after the Nazis came to power, Leitner, a Jew and a revolutionary, emigrated from Germany and went into exile. Her works were banned from publication in Nazi Germany. She earned her living by writing in the anti-Nazi magazine Das Wort published in Moscow. In 1940, she was in France, and as with a number of exiles from Germany, she was interned at Gurs internment camp. She managed to escape but could not leave France. The conditions of her death are unclear. In July 1940, she wrote to Hubertus, Prince of Löwenstein-Wertheim-Freudenberg, the most famous of the founding signatories of the American Guild for German Cultural Freedom. In total she had already written at least twelve letters to the guild between 1938 and March 1941, seeking assistance: the letters have been kept by them in their "Archive of German Exiles". This last appeal for desperate help is Leitner's last known piece of writing. However, she was last seen in Marseille early in 1941 by Anna Seghers and Alexander Abusch.

She may have died in exile: one source speculates that she died of hunger, isolated in Marseille. Another speculates that she was one of many Jewish political exiles from Germany who failed to obtain exit visas from the French authorities and were rounded up and deported to concentration camps in Germany where many were killed.

== Selected works ==
- 1930, Hotel Amerika, roman-reportage
- 1932, Eine Frau reist durch die Welt, reportage
- 2013, Mädchen mit drei Namen. Reportagen aus Deutschland und ein Berliner Roman, 1928–1933, Berlin, AvivA Verlag
- 2014, Elisabeth, ein Hitlermädchen. Ein Roman und Reportagen (1934–1939), Berlin, AvivA Verlag
