= Dorotheenstadt Cemetery =

Historic cemetery in Berlin

Coordinates: 52.5284°N 13.3837°E

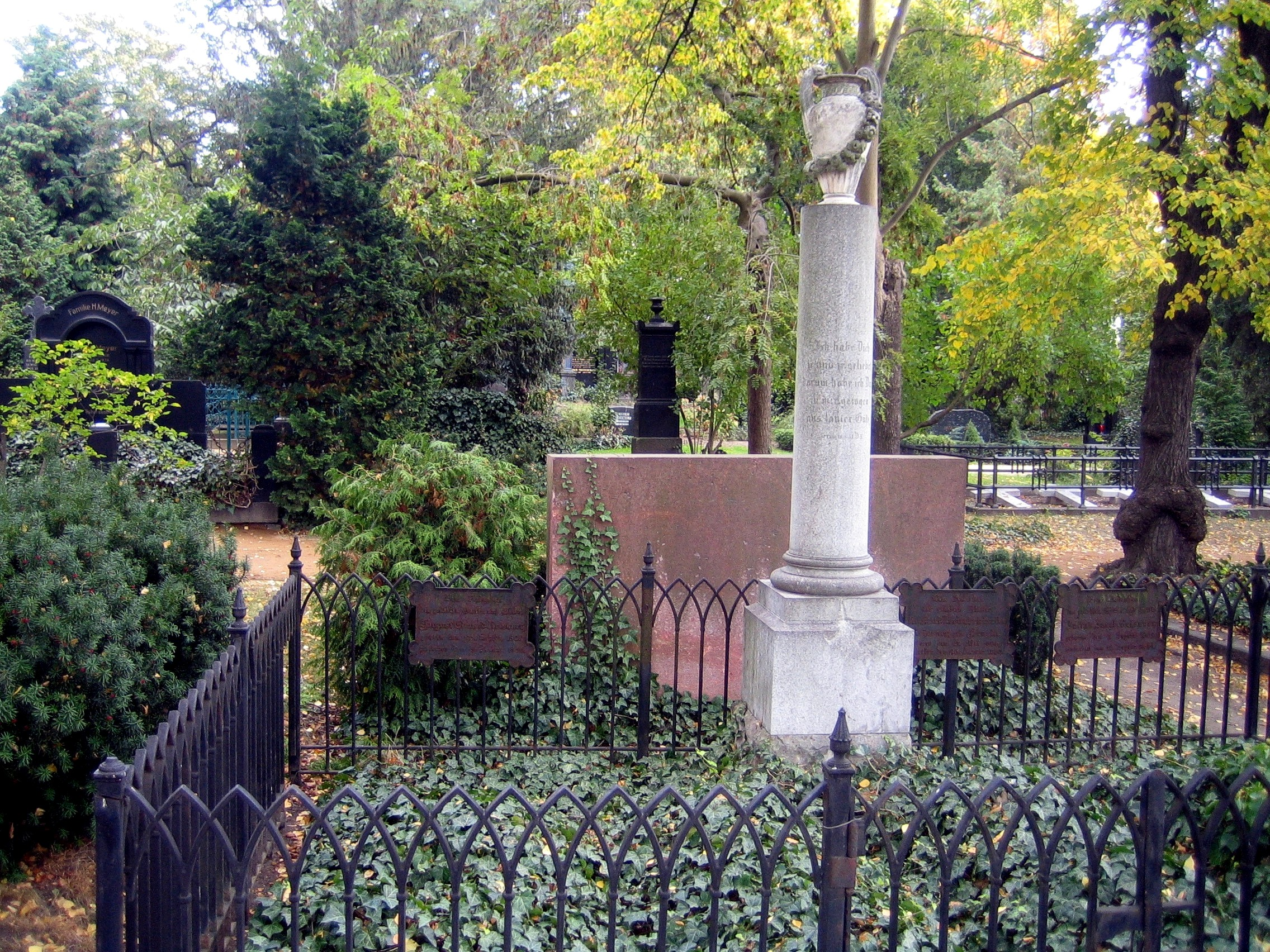
Gravesites in the cemetery

The Dorotheenstadt Cemetery, officially the Cemetery of the Dorotheenstadt and Friedrichswerder Parishes, is a landmarked Protestant burial ground located in the Berlin district of Mitte which dates to the late 18th century. The entrance to the 1.7-hectare (4.2-acre) plot is at 126 Chaussee Straße (next door to the Brecht House, where Bertolt Brecht and Helene Weigel spent their last years, at 125 Chaussee Straße). It is also directly adjacent to the French cemetery (also known as the cemetery of the Huguenots), established in 1780, and is sometimes confused with it.

== History ==
In the second half of the 18th century, Berlin's population was growing and there was insufficient land for cemeteries because of pressure to build on vacant land and fear of epidemics. Prussian King Frederick II, "the Great", donated land outside the Oranienburg Gate of the Berlin Customs Wall for this purpose; 4 cemeteries were established, of which the French cemetery and the Dorotheenstadt Cemetery survive. The Dorotheenstadt Cemetery was established jointly by the two (Protestant) parishes in the early 1760s; burials began in 1770.

Although initially mostly the lower classes were buried in the Dorotheenstadt Cemetery, because of its proximity to Berlin University (founded 1810, since 1949 Humboldt University) and several scholarly academies (sciences, arts, architecture, singing), many prominent figures who worked and in many cases lived in Dorotheenstadt and Friedrichswerder have found their last resting place here.

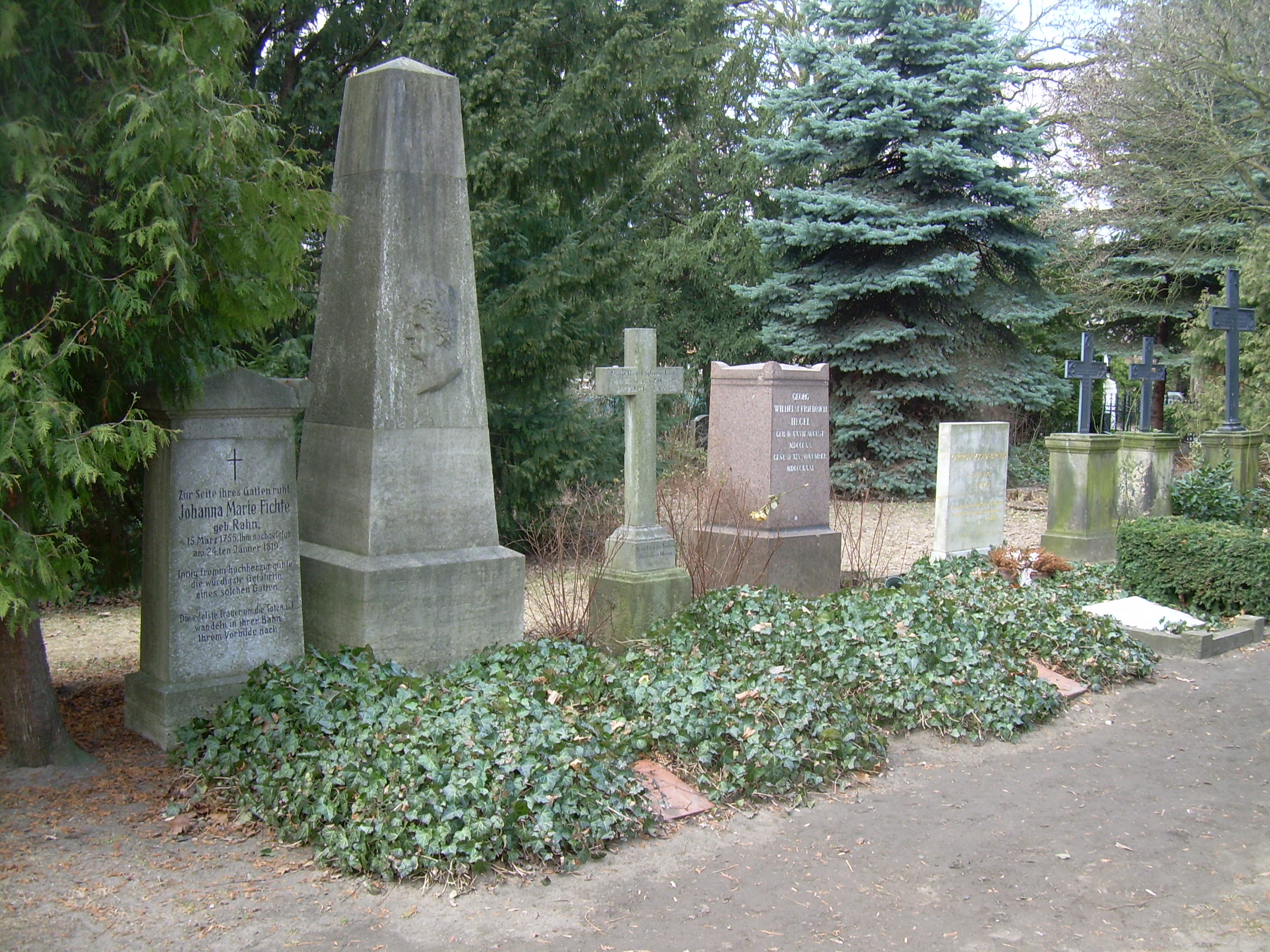
Graves of Hegel and Fichte

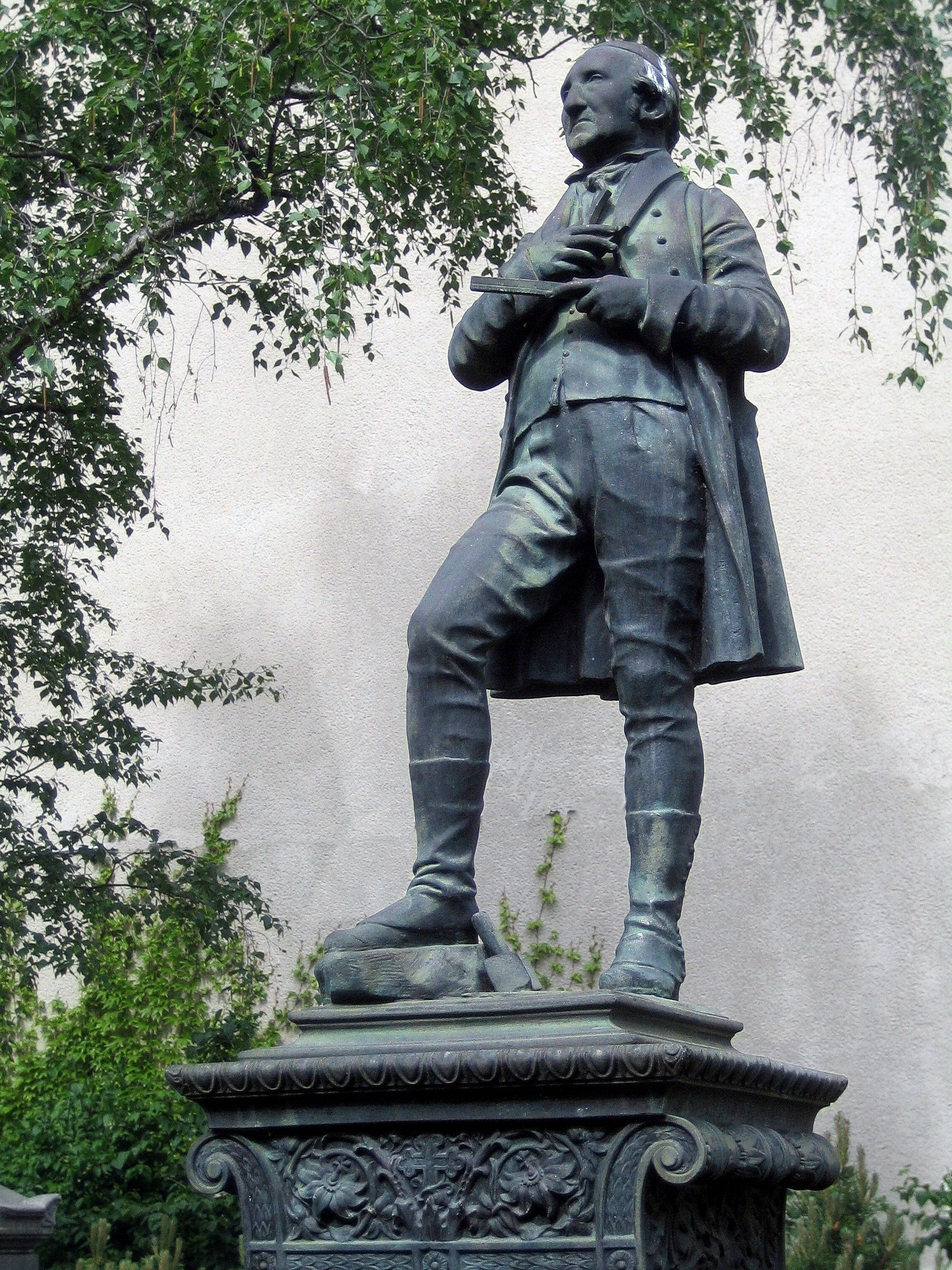
Statue of Johann Gottfried Schadow on his grave, by Heinrich Kaehler

As the social standing of those buried in the cemetery rose, numerous famous 19th-century artists and architects designed grave markers. For example, Johann Gottfried Schadow designed monuments for his second wife and himself. An 1822 statuette of Schadow by his student Heinrich Kaehler was placed on Schadow's grave in 1851. In 1975, a 1909 marble replica of Schadow's 1821 statue of Martin Luther for the marketplace in Wittenberg was placed at the end of the main axis of the cemetery. (It had previously been in the nearby Dorotheenstadt church, which was destroyed in World War II.) The bust of the industrialist August Borsig was created by Christian Daniel Rauch.

The cemetery was enlarged several times between 1814 and 1826. In the 1830s the parishes separately acquired land for expansion elsewhere: Dorotheenstadt in Gesundbrunnen, Friedrichswerder in Kreuzberg. By the end of the 1860s, the original cemetery was full, and after 1869 burials were only permitted in already purchased plots. In 1889 some of the land was sold in connection with a road improvement project, and some important graves had to be relocated. However, after the introduction of cremation the space pressure was no longer so great, and new plots were allowed beginning in 1921. The two parishes were combined in 1945 and administer their 3 cemeteries together.

The cemetery has suffered in hard times: precious metals and iron (cast iron was a popular material for grave monuments in Prussia and they were produced at a royal foundry in Berlin) have been stolen from graves, in the 1930s some stones were sold to masons for reuse, and lack of money has hampered adequate upkeep. In World War II, the surrounding area was heavily damaged and the cemetery was also damaged. In the 1960s clearance of the site to create a park was proposed.

== Landmark protection and restoration ==
Protection of the cemetery as a cultural landmark began in 1935 with an initial survey; it was listed in 1983. Between 2000 and 2006, 38 graves were restored, including those of Christian Daniel Rauch, Johann Heinrich Strack and Karl Friedrich Schinkel. The restoration of Strack's grave alone, requiring the importation of Italian marble, cost €250,000. The largest mausoleum, that of Schinkel's pupil, the architect Friedrich Hitzig, was restored in 2007; it features frescos that are now almost unique in Berlin and that were in a critical state. Future restoration work is expected to cost €6 million.

== Collective monuments ==
=== Resistance fighters ===
The cemetery contains a monument to resistance fighters killed by the Nazi regime: a tall cross rises above a stone block bearing the names of Klaus Bonhoeffer, Hans John, Richard Kuenzer, Carl Adolf Marks, Wilhelm zur Nieden, Friedrich Justus Perels, Rüdiger Schleicher and Hans Ludwig Sierks, who were involved in the 20 July 1944 assassination plot against Adolf Hitler and were executed by the SS in a nearby park on the night of 22/23 April. The monument also commemorates Dietrich Bonhoeffer and Hans von Dohnanyi, who were killed in concentration camps, and Justus Delbrück, who survived the war but died soon after in Russian captivity.

Next to the memorial, a marker points to a mass grave of 64 people killed near the cemetery in the last days of the war, many of them unknowns.

=== Academy of the Arts ===
A small area surrounded by a low hedge is reserved for members of the nearby Berlin Academy of Arts, among others René Graetz, Anna Seghers, Erich Arendt and Lin Jaldati, a Jew who survived three concentration camps to make a successful career as a dancer and singer of Jewish songs.

== Honorary graves ==
Today the city of Berlin maintains a number of honorary graves for people who made distinguished contributions in politics and culture, including Günter Gaus, who headed the West German representative office in East Germany (located just on the other side of the cemetery wall) from 1974 to 1981; Herbert Marcuse, philosopher of the Frankfurt School who was born in Berlin but emigrated to the US in 1933 (2003); composer Hanns Eisler; Hans Mayer, a professor of literature who emigrated from East Germany in 1963 (2001); the playwright Heiner Müller (1995: a bird bath shaped like an ash tray adorns the notorious cigar smoker's grave); and Johannes Rau, the eighth president of West Germany, who expressly wished to be buried here (2007).

In his song Der Hugenottenfriedhof (1969) East German dissident singer Wolf Biermann, who lived nearby at Chausseestraße 131, mentions the adjacent cemetery and some of those who are buried in this one (Brecht, Weigel, Hegel, Eisler, Langhoff, Heartfield, Becher).

== Famous gravesites ==
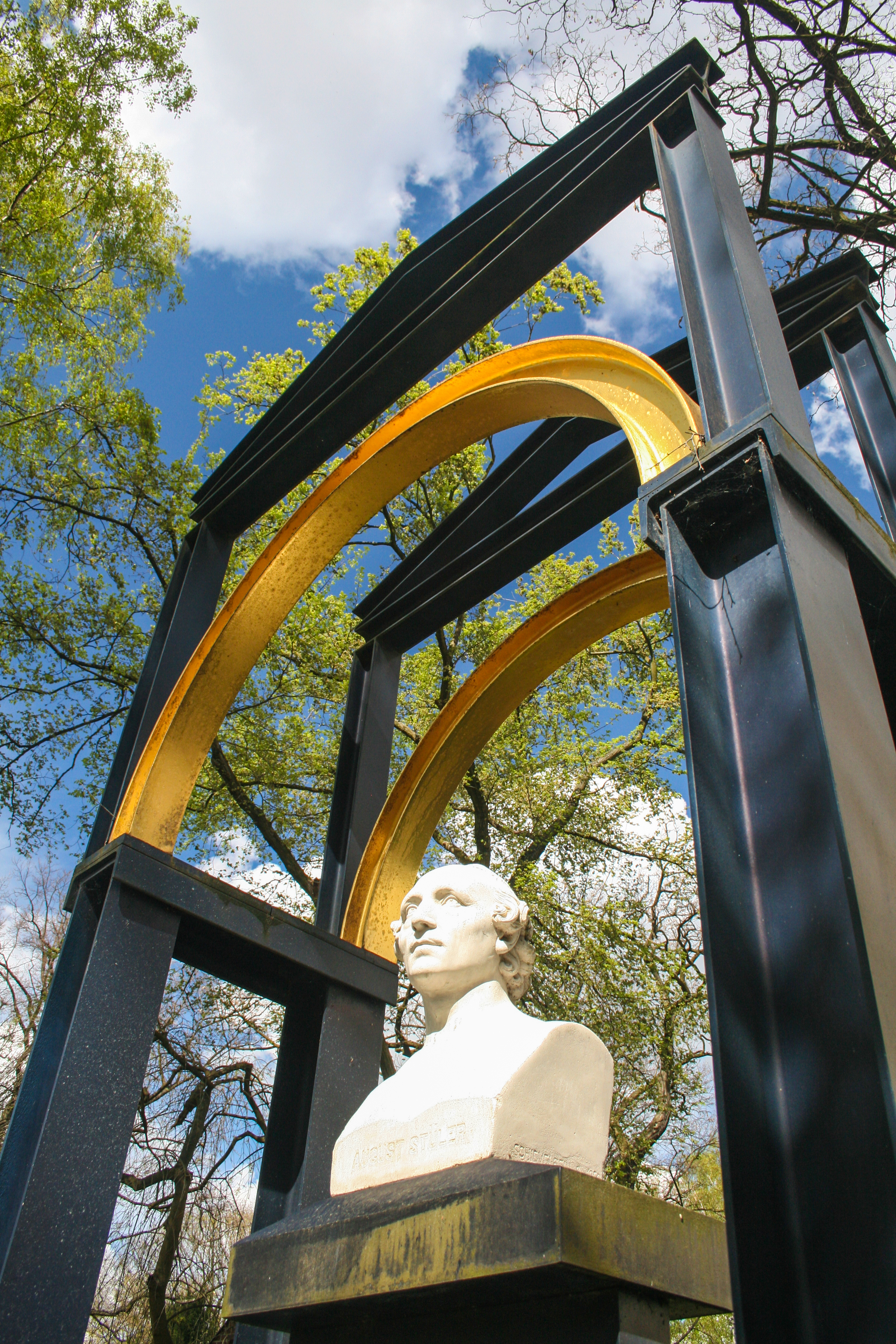
Grave of the German architect Friedrich August Stüler

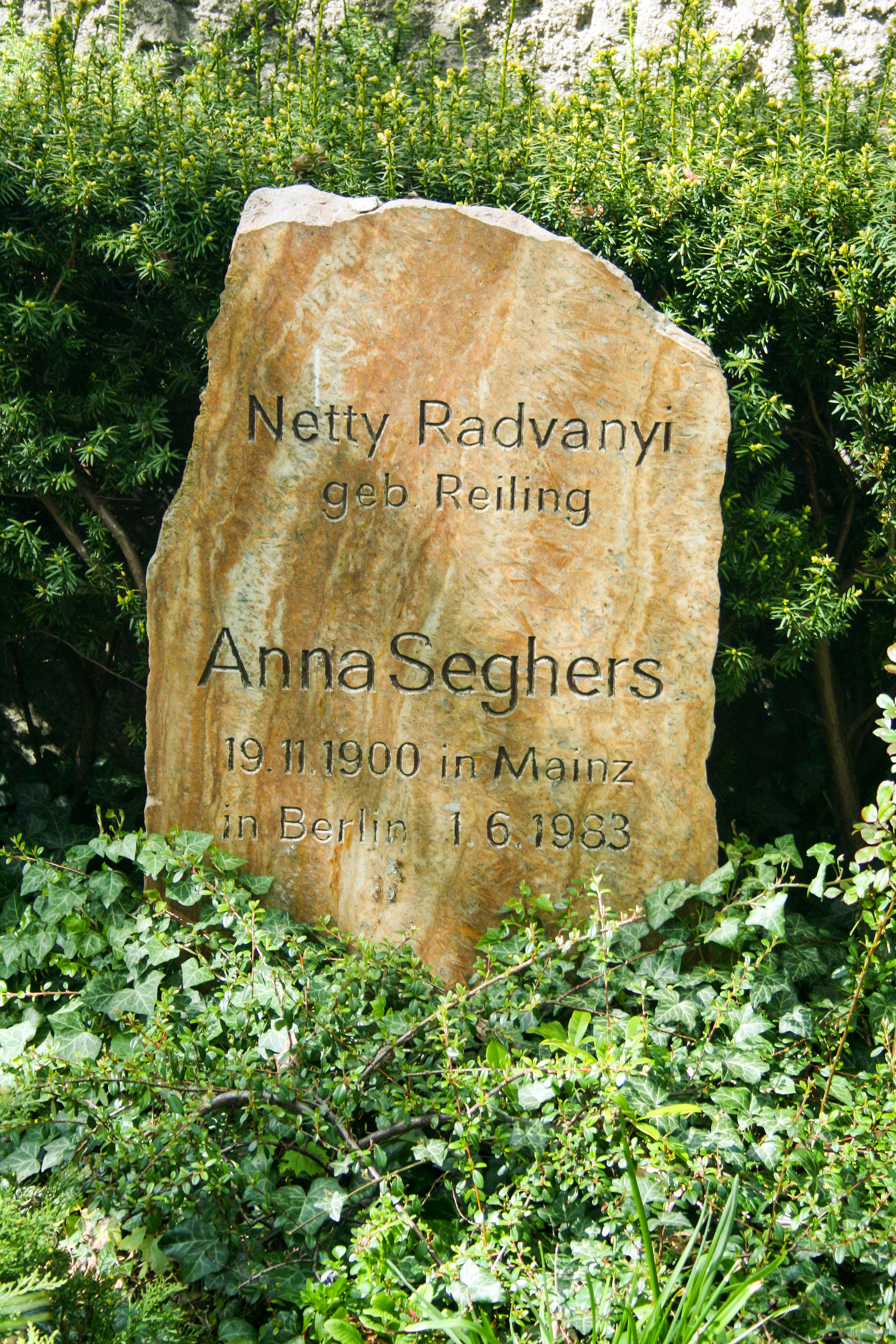
Grave of the German writer Anna Seghers

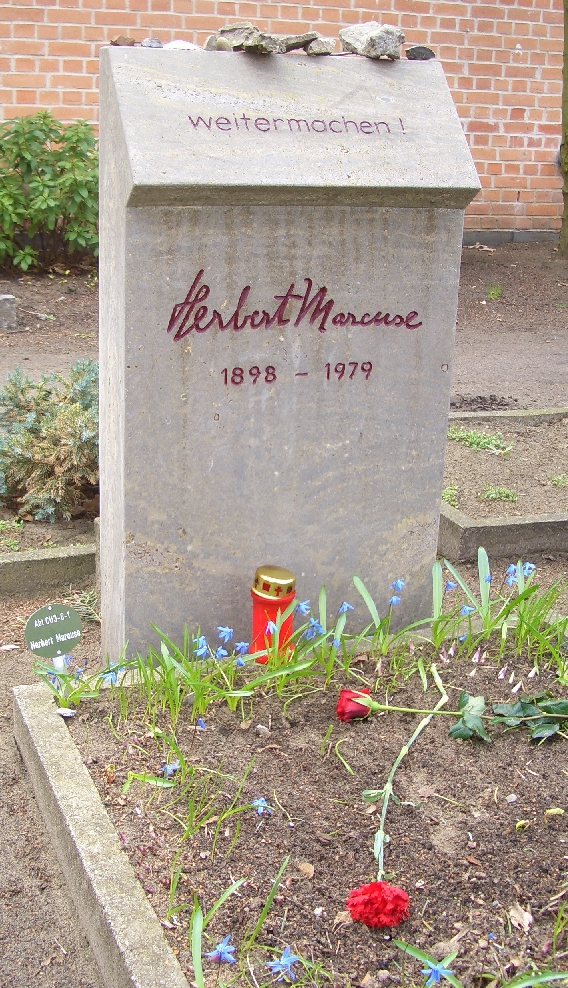
Grave of Herbert Marcuse; Weitermachen means "Carry on."

- Rudolf Bahro (1935–1997), East German journalist und dissident
- Johannes R. Becher (1891–1958), East German writer and Minister of Culture
- Ruth Berghaus (1927–1996), choreographer & director
- Frank Beyer (1932–2006), East German film director
- Dietrich Bonhoeffer (memorial, no grave) (1906–1945), theologian and anti-Nazi resistor
- Klaus Bonhoeffer (1901–1945), anti-Nazi resistor
- August Borsig (1804–1854), industrialist
- Bertolt Brecht (1898–1956), poet, author and playwright
- Elfriede Brüning (1910–2014), author
- Paul Dessau (1894–1979), composer
- Hans von Dohnanyi (1902–1945), anti-Nazi resistor
- Hanns Eisler (1898–1962), composer
- Johann Gottlieb Fichte (1762–1814), philosopher
- Günter Gaus (1929–2004), West German journalist and politician
- Erwin Geschonneck (1906–2008), actor
- Friedrich Goldmann (1941–2009), composer and conductor
- John Heartfield (1891–1968), artist
- Georg Wilhelm Friedrich Hegel (1770–1831), philosopher
- Stephan Hermlin (1915–1997), writer
- Wolfgang Herrndorf (1965–2013), German author
- August Wilhelm von Hofmann (1818-1892), German chemist
- Christoph Wilhelm Hufeland (1762–1836), physician
- Jürgen Kuczynski (1904–1997), historian and economist
- Ernst Litfaß (1816–1871), inventor of the Litfass kiosk
- Kurt Maetzig (1911–2012), filmmaker
- Heinrich Mann (1871–1950), author
- Herbert Marcuse (1898–1979), philosopher
- Hans Mayer (1907–2001), writer and literary scholar
- Heiner Müller (1929–1995), playwright
- Johannes Rau (1931–2006), president of Germany (1999–2004)
- Christian Daniel Rauch (1777–1857), sculptor
- Johann Gottfried Schadow (1764–1850), sculptor and artist
- Karl Friedrich Schinkel (1781–1841), architect
- Anna Seghers (1900–1983), author
- Friedel von Wangenheim (1939–2001), actor
- Günther Simon (1925–1972), East German actor
- Karl Wilhelm Ferdinand Solger (1780–1819), philosopher
- Leo Spies (1899–1965), composer and conductor
- Friedrich August Stüler (1800–1865), architect
- George Tabori (1914–2007), theater director and author
- Bodo Uhse (1904–1963), East German writer
- Helene Weigel (1900–1971), East German actress and theater director
- Christa Wolf (1929–2011), author
- Arnold Zweig (1887–1968), East German author

== Sources ==
- Klaus Hammer Friedhöfe in Berlin – Ein kunst- und kulturgeschichtlicher Führer. Berlin: Jaron, 2006. ISBN 3-89773-132-0. pp. 40–56.
- Jörg Haspel and Klaus-Henning von Krosigk (Ed.). Gartendenkmale in Berlin: Friedhöfe. Ed. Katrin Lesser, Jörg Kuhn and Detlev Pietzsch. Beiträge zur Denkmalpflege in Berlin 27. Petersberg: Imhof, 2008. ISBN 978-3-86568-293-2. pp. 115–123.
