= Die Rote Fahne =

German newspaper

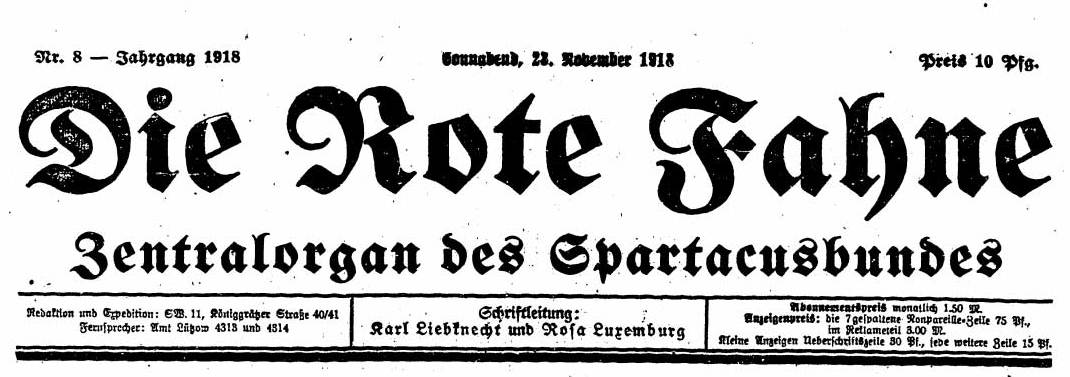
- Die Rote Fahne header from 23 November 1918
- Type: Daily newspaper
- Founder(s): Wilhelm Hasselmann, Rosa Luxemburg, Karl Liebknecht, Paul Frölich
- Founded: 1876; 150 years ago
- Political alignment: Communist
- Language: German
- Country: Germany

Die Rote Fahne (German: [diː ˈʁoːtə ˈfaːnə], The Red Flag) was a German newspaper originally founded in 1876 by Socialist Worker's Party leader Wilhelm Hasselmann, and which has been since published on and off, at times underground, by German Socialists and Communists. Karl Liebknecht and Rosa Luxemburg famously published it in 1918 as organ of the Spartacus League.

Following the deaths of Liebknecht and Luxemburg during the chancellorship of the Social Democratic Party of Germany's Friedrich Ebert, the newspaper was published by the Communist Party of Germany with some interruptions. Banned by the Nazi Party's government of Adolf Hitler after 1933, publication continued illegally, underground.

== History ==
=== 1876 ===
Wilhelm Hasselmann of the Socialist Workers' Party of Germany (now SPD) and member of the German Reichstag founded a short-lived, weekly newspaper called Die rote Fahne.

=== 1918–1933 ===
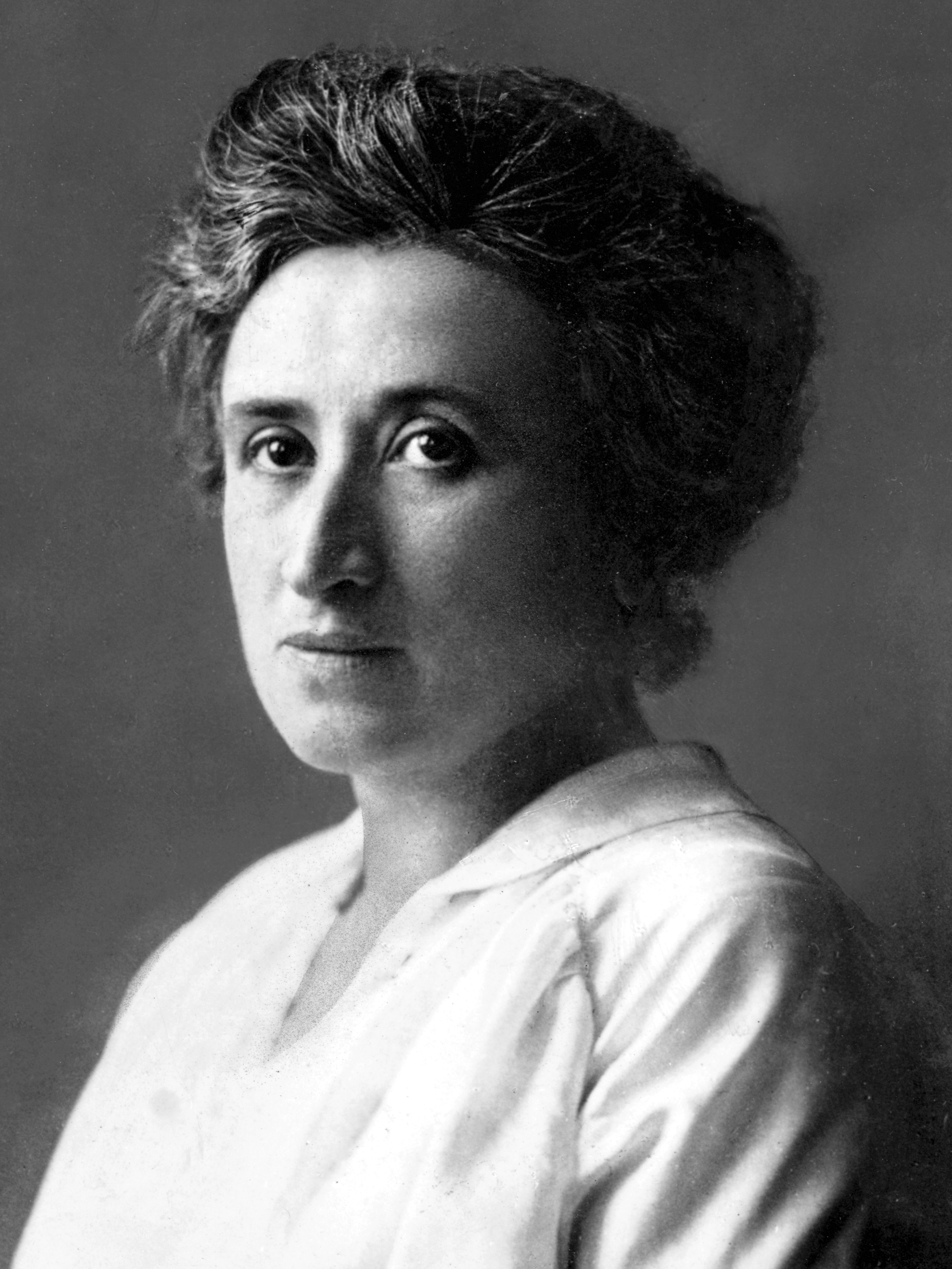
Rosa Luxemburg

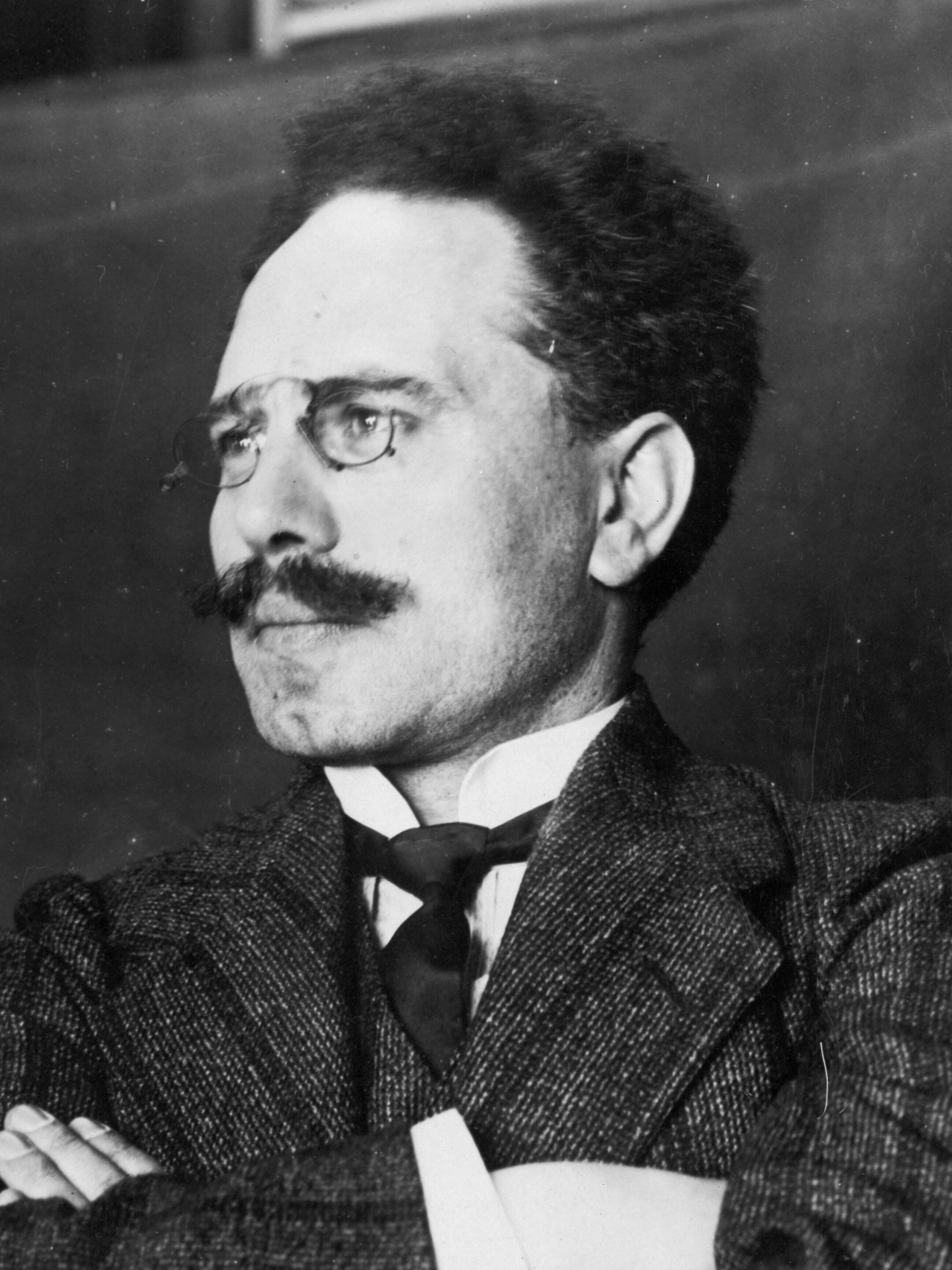
Karl Liebknecht

Using the newspaper's subtitle as indicator of its political allegiance, Die Rote Fahne was successively the central organ of:

- Spartacus League: 9 November 1918 to 30 December 1918
- Communist Party of Germany: 1 January 1919 to 19 September 1920 (reflecting the KPD's submission to the Comintern on
- Communist Party of Germany: 19 September 1920 to roughly 23 March 1933 (date of passage of the Nazi Enabling Act)

The publication was proscribed from October 1923 to March 1924, as part of the ban on the German Communist Party. The newspaper continued in illegal production and distribution, sometimes renamed "Rote Sturmfahne" ("Red Storm Flag") or "Die Fahne der Revolution" ("The Flag of the Revolution"). In 1926, the newspaper moved into the Karl Liebknecht House, to which it added in July 1928 a rotary press. On 23 February 1933, Nazi police occupied Karl-Liebknecht-Haus and closed it the following day, anticipating the Nazi ban on all communist and socialist press after the Reichstag fire a few days later (28 February 1933).

Many prominent Germans and others worked on the newspaper:

- Founders included: Rosa Luxemburg, Karl Liebknecht, Paul Frölich
- Publishers included: Hans Marchwitza and Johannes R. Becher
- Editors included: Ernst Meyer (1918–1919), August Thalheimer (1919–?), Julian Gumperz (1920? – later, second husband of Hede Massing), Werner Scholem (1920--?), Gerhart Eisler (1921–?? already, first husband of Hede Massing), Arkadi Maslow (1921-?), Heinz Neumann (1922–1928?), Max Matern (1925-?), Hans Lorbeer (1928--?), Erika Heymann (1930–1933), Albert Norden (1930–1933), Lutz Łask (1930s and husband of Franz Kafka's lover Dora Diamant), Franz Koritschoner, György Lukács, Wolfgang Harich
- Contributors included: Ilse Barea-Kulcsar (1922–?), Emil Barth (1918?), Lilly Becher (1921–?), Willi Schlamm (1923–?), Albert Hotopp (1923–1926), Hanns Eisler (1927), Erich Mielke (1928–1931), John Sieg (1928–1933?), Jürgen Kuczynski (1930–1933), Max Zimmering (1935–1938?), Thomas Ring
- Artists included: John Heartfield

=== 1933–1942 ===
Outlawed after the end of the Weimar Republic and the Reichstag fire in 1933, it was illegally distributed during the Nazi regime by underground groups close to the Communist Party until 1942. Wilhelm Guddorf was known to have been an editor of the newspaper in the late 1930s.

=== 1970 and afterwards ===
Logo of Die Rote Fahne published by the KPD founded in 1990

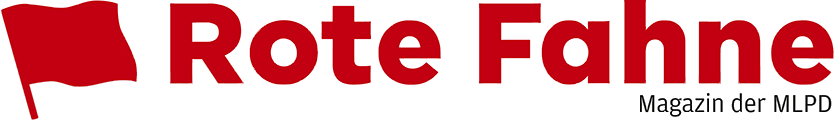
Logo of Rote Fahne published by the MLPD

Following the events of 1968, several projects of ideologically divergent groups of the so-called old and new left arose in the Federal Republic of Germany with the aim to build a new communist party. While the German Communist Party (DKP), which is widely known as the West German KPD successor party, publishes the newspaper Unsere Zeit as its party organ; several of the various competing small communist parties and organisations, the so-called K groups, each with their own differing ideological concepts of communism (from Maoism to Stalinism to Trotskyism), started their own newspaper projects under the Rote Fahne name.

Two current political parties publish a newspaper as their main party outlet named Die Rote Fahne: the Communist Party of Germany (KPD), a fringe party founded in 1990 by disgruntled members of the Socialist Unity Party of Germany, and the Marxist–Leninist Party of Germany (MLPD).

Another currently circulated publication of the same name is run by Stephan Steins as part of the KPD-initiative. This publication has been criticized for promoting conspiracy theories as well as anti-Zionism and criticizing mass migration.

== See also ==
- List of newspapers in Germany

== External sources ==
- Die rote Fahne - Staatsbibliothek zu Berlin
- Rote Fahne News
- Rote Fahne Magazine
