= Mario Frank =

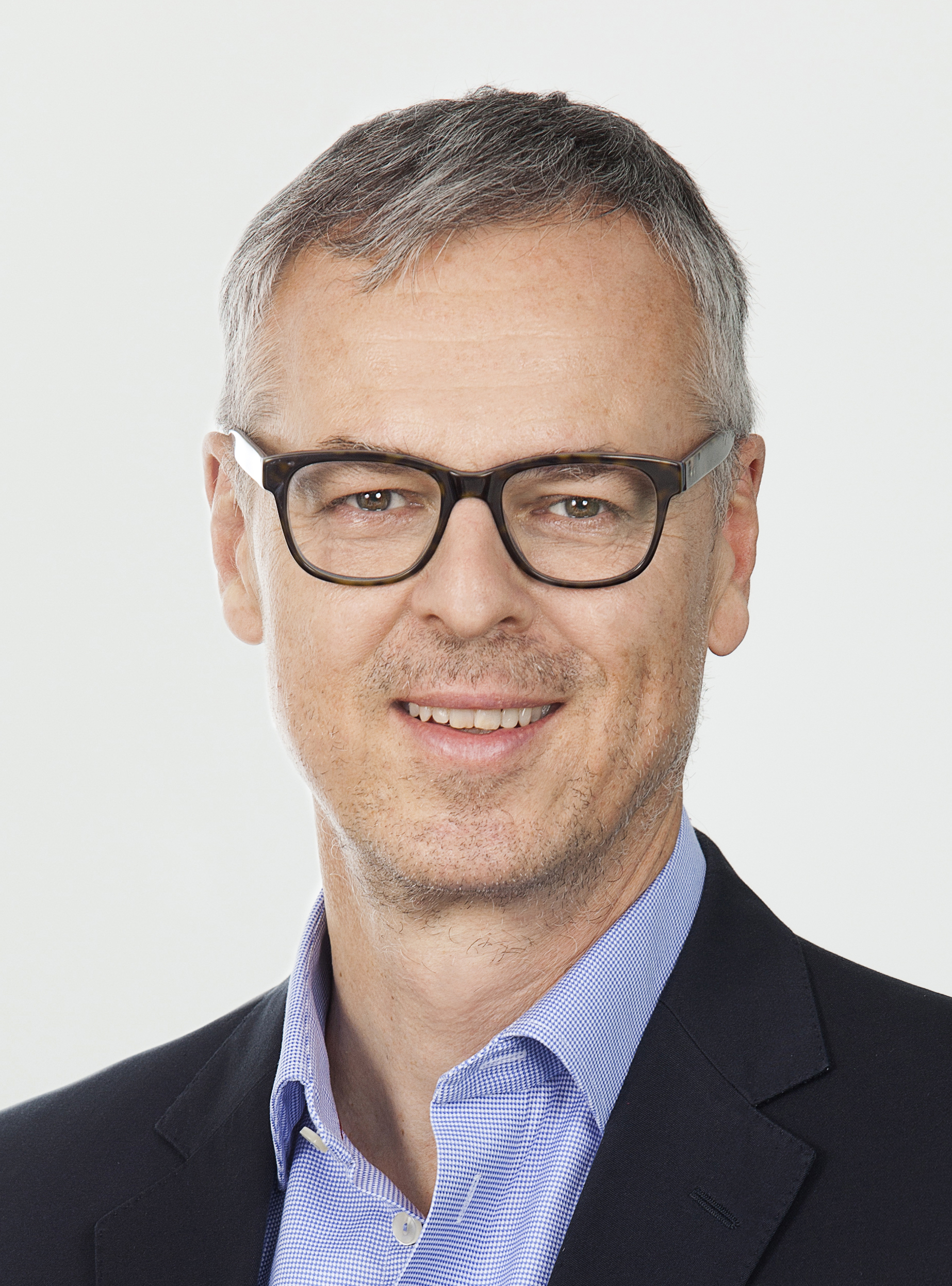
Dr. Mario Frank 2013

Mario Frank (born 31 May 1958) qualified in Germany as a lawyer. He holds a West German doctorate, obtained for a piece of work on the East German Ministry of Justice. He has pursued a managerial career in the media sector. For a year during 2007/2008 he was chief executive of the Spiegel publishing group. In recent decades he has emerged as an important political biographer.

== Life ==
Mario Frank was born in Rostock, a major port city on the north coast of what was at that time the German Democratic Republic (East Germany). He spent most of his childhood in Switzerland, but by the time he was due to undertake his military service he did so in West Germany, at Landshut. It was also in Bavaria that he commenced his university study of jurisprudence, at University of Regensburg, but by the time he completed his degree he had moved again, this time to Freiburg im Breisgau, which is also where he passed his level I national law exams. After that he took a position as a referendary (loosely: "legal trainee") at the Berlin high court ("Kammergericht"), and then at the German-South African chamber of commerce in Johannesburg. He passed his level II national law exams in Berlin in 1987. In 1988 he received from the University of Regensburg his doctorate of laws in exchange for a dissertation on developments at the East German Ministry of Justice

In 1987 Frank embarked on a professional career in the media sector, employed as an assistant to Mark Wössner, who at that time was the chairman of Bertelsmann. In 1989 he sought to broaden his experience with a move to the Gruner + Jahr publishing conglomerate, initially as operations director at the Hamburger Morgenpost (newspaper) and subsequently as publishing and managing director at the company's "Boulevard newspapers" division in Hamburg, Dresden and Berlin. In 1994 he was appointed chief executive ("Geschäftsführer") at the "Dresdner Druck- und Verlagshaus GmbH & Co. KG" (printing and publishing business) which included in its portfolio the "Sächsische Zeitung" and the region's version of the "Morgenpost" (newspaper).

At the start of 2007 he was appointed sole chief executive of the Spiegel publishing group. His responsibilities encompassed not just the magazine but also its television company and its web presence. His time at Spiegel was characterised by a certain amount of conflict, however, and during the summer of 2008 he left. His agreed resignation was formalised with effect from 15 September 2008. Since 2011 Frank has worked as a self-employed lawyer in Berlin, focusing on family law. Alongside that, between 2013 and 2016 he held a senior position with the newly launched Berlin Communications Consultancy "von Neuem".

== The author ==
In parallel with his professional career, Frank has emerged as an author on contemporary history. His biography of Walter Ulbricht appeared in 2001 and has become, in the eyes of many, a standard academic work. His work "Der Tod im Führerbunker – Hitlers letzte Tage" ("Death in the Führerbunker - Hitler's final days") has already been translated into five languages, with non-German editions appearing under licence in Poland, France, Latvia, Hungary and the Czech Republic. In October 2013 he published his biographical study of Joachim Gauck, at that time the President of Germany.
