= Julian Borchardt =

German politician (1868–1932)

Julian Borchardt (13 January 1868 – 16 February 1932) was a socialist politician, journalist, activist and participant in the Zimmerwald Left.

Borchardt was born in Bromberg, Prussia (modern Bydgoszcz, Poland) in 1868. He became a socialist journalist and writer, serving as editor on Social Democrat newspapers from 1901 to 1906. He was appointed as a lecturer to the SPD central education committee in 1907 and entered the Prussian diet in 1911.

In 1913 he relinquished these posts and started editing Lichtstrahlen, which provided a platform for German and international left anti-war-opposition and texts of the nascent Communist movement towards the end of the First World War and after. However he never joined the Communist party. He also wrote on historical and economic subjects including a widely translated digest of Karl Marx's Das Kapital.

He was a member of the Association of Proletarian-Revolutionary Authors.

From 1927 until his death in Berlin, 1932, he was working on a history of Germany which was never completed. His manuscript of this is in the International Institute of Social History.

== Texts ==
- Preface to The People's Marx, 1919
- The Essence of Marx's Theory of Crises'', 1919
- Di yesoydes̀ fun der poliṭisher eḳonomye: loyṭ'n Ḳapiṭal fun Ḳarl Marḳs, 1925 in Yiddish
