= Johannes-R.-Becher-Medaille =

East-German decoration

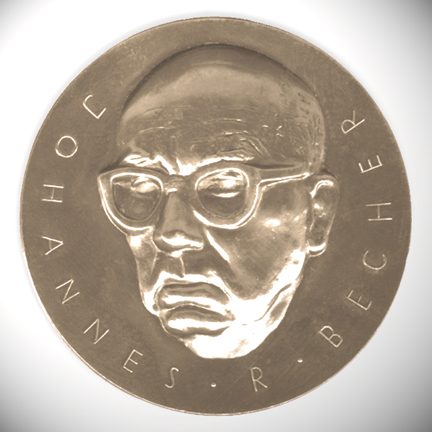
Johannes-R.-Becher-Medaille (avers)

The Johannes-R.-Becher-Medaille was a civil decoration of East Germany created in homage to the poet and politician Johannes R. Becher. It was awarded by the Cultural Association of the GDR.

== Description ==
The medal is made of bronze, with a diameter of four centimetres. and shows on the obverse side a portrait of Johannes R. Becher surrounded by his name written in capital letters.

== Award conditions ==
It rewarded services "for the development of socialist culture in the GDR". It was awarded to individuals and communities from 1961 onwards for achievements in the fields of arts and culture, but also sports and recreation. The Johannes R. Becher Medal had three levels: bronze, silver and gold.

The award ceremony usually took place on 22 May, Johannes R. Becher's birthday.

== Recipients ==
- 1961: Anna Seghers, Nathan Notowicz
- 1962: Hans Pischner, Ehm Welk, Curt Trepte (Silver)
- 1963: Walter Womacka
- 1964: Gret Palucca (Gold), Dieter Noll
- 1965: Günter Hofé (Gold)
- 1966: Harry Hindemith (Gold), Herbert Sandberg
- 1967: Richard Paulick (Gold), Herbert Ihering
- 1968: Erich Arendt, Fritz Duda (Silver), Gerhard Thieme, Bernhard Seeger
- 1969: Konrad Wolf (Gold), Theo Balden
- 1970: Barbara Dittus
- 1971: Herbert Scurla
- 1973: Annemarie Auer
- 1975: Karl Czok, Marja Kubašec
- 1978: Hanns Cibulka, Karl Erich Müller (Gold)
- 1981: Inge Keller, Heinz Kahlau
- 1985: Helmut Baierl
- Walter Basan
- Konstantin Fedin
- Hedwig Voegt

According to the German article, 171 people are recipients of this medal.
