= Gysi =

Gysi is a surname of Swiss-German origin. Notable people with the surname include:

- Barbara Gysi (born 1964), Swiss politician
- Gabriele Gysi (born 1946), German actress
- Gregor Gysi (born 1948), German politician, the Left Party, formerly SED, PDS
- Klaus Gysi (1912–1999), Minister of Culture, German Democratic Republic
- Willy Gysi (1918–2001), Swiss field handball player
- Andrew (Drew) Gysi (born 1964), American Pastor, Podcaster and preacher/teacher on Biblical Stewardship (Stewardology Podcast, LifeInstitute.org)

== See also ==
- Gisin (disambiguation)
- Gysin (disambiguation)
