= Hans Pischner =

German harpsichordist, musicologist, opera director and politician

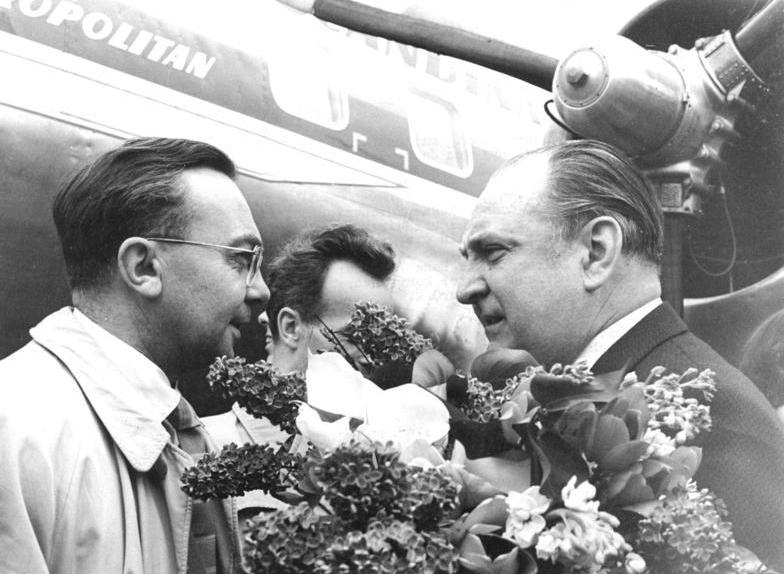
- Pischner (left) with conductor Franz Konwitschny, 1961

President of the Cultural Association of the German Democratic Republic
- In office 1977–1990
- Preceded by: Max Burghardt
- Succeeded by: office abolished

Personal details
- Born: February 20, 1914 Breslau, German Empire
- Died: October 15, 2016 (aged 102) Berlin, Germany
- Party: Socialist Unity Party of Germany
- Occupation: Musicologist, activist, musician
- Awards: Order of Merit of the Federal Republic of Germany (1999); Order of Karl Marx (1989); Star of People's Friendship (1979); National Prize of the German Democratic Republic (1976); Patriotic Order of Merit, in gold (1973)

Hans Pischner (20 February 1914 – 15 October 2016) was a German harpsichordist, musicologist, opera director, and politician active in the German Democratic Republic (GDR). He encouraged the creation of musical and artistic cultural institutions in East Germany, and used his position in the SED to prevent any further brain drain of artists and musicians after the Berlin Wall was constructed by encouraging and supporting the arts. He served as Chairman of the Kulturbund from 1977 until German reunification in 1990.

From 1946 he taught at the University of Music Franz Liszt Weimar, becoming its deputy director in 1947. In 1948 he was appointed professor. From 1950 to 1954, Pischner was head of the Music Department in the State Committee for Broadcasting of the GDR and helped shape the state broadcasting. In the newly founded Ministry of Culture he was initially head of the Music Department from 1954 to 1956 and then served from 1956 to 1963 as Deputy Minister of Culture under Johannes R. Becher and Alexander Abusch or Hans Bentzien.

In 1956, his area of responsibility included the main departments of music and VEB Deutsche Schallplatten, artistic teaching institutions, cultural mass work and the German concert and guest performance directorate, as well as the budget and auditing department. He was thus largely responsible on the state side for the music policy of the GDR.

== Awards and honours ==
- Patriotic Order of Merit in Gold (1973)
- National Prize of the German Democratic Republic (1976)
- Star of People's Friendship in Gold (1979)
- Order of Karl Marx (1989)
- Order of Merit of the Federal Republic of Germany (1999)

Political offices
Preceded by Max Burghardt	Chairman of the Cultural Association of the GDR; 1977–1990	Succeeded by none
