= National Prize of the German Democratic Republic =

German prize

- Obverse and reverse
- Awarded for: Scientific or artistic merits
- Date: 7 October
- Country: German Democratic Republic
- Rewards: 100,000 marks (First Class), 50,000 marks (Second Class), 25,000 marks (Third Class)
- First award: 1949
- Final award: 1989
- Ribbon bar

The National Prize of the German Democratic Republic (East Germany) (German: Nationalpreis der Deutschen Demokratischen Republik) was an award of the German Democratic Republic (GDR) given out in three different classes for scientific, artistic, and other meritorious achievement. With scientific achievements, it was often given to entire research groups rather than individual scientists.

== History ==
The National Prize was awarded on 7 October, "Day of the Republic" (German: Tag der Republik), every year from 1949 to 1989. It was given for "outstanding creative work in the fields of science and technology, important mathematical and scientific discoveries and technological inventions, the introduction of new working and production methods" and "outstanding works and achievements in the areas of art and literature." This coveted award could be given to East German citizens, groups, and even foreigners provided they made crucial contributions to socialist culture and science.

The National Prize was awarded in three classes, with corresponding monetary awards for each class. First class was 100,000 marks, second class was 50,000 marks and third class was 25,000 marks.

The medal is round, gold-plated, 26mm in diameter with a portrait of Goethe circled by the words "German Democratic Republic" (German: Deutsche Demokratische Republik) on the obverse side. On the reverse are the words "National Award" (German: Nationalpreis) circled by a pair of laurel wreaths. The ribbon bar consisted of the vertical bars consisting of the national colors of black, red and gold with a gold medal GDR state symbol attached to the center of the ribbon. The medal was worn on the upper right side of the chest.

== Notable recipients ==
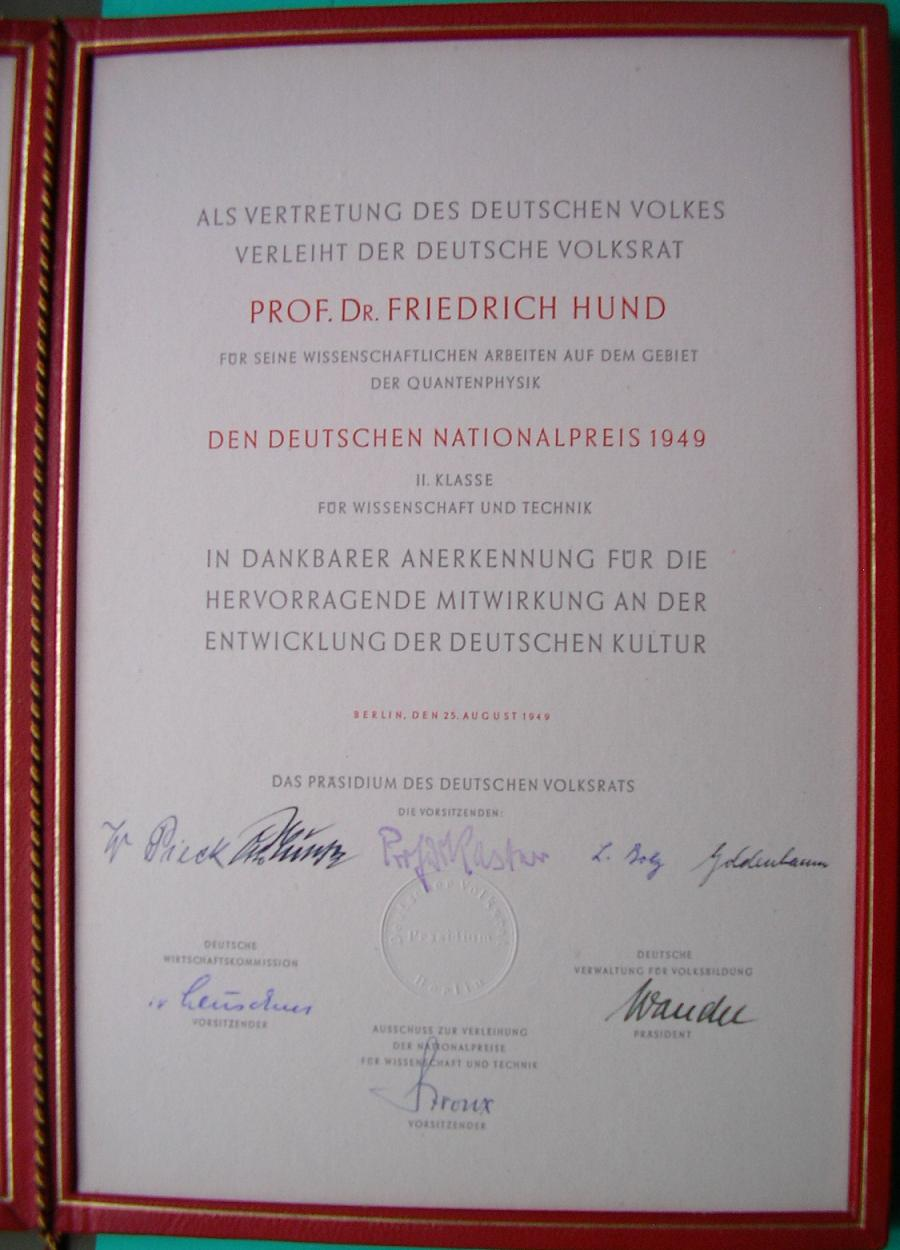
Diploma for Friedrich Hund (1949)

- 1949: Thomas Mann, Herbert Eulenberg, Fred Oelßner, Hermann Abendroth, Jürgen Kuczynski, Erich Engel, Friedrich Hund
- 1950: Hans Boegehold, Hugo Schrade, August Klemm, Hans Marchwitza, Eduard Maurer, Johannes Stroux
- 1951: Bertolt Brecht, Jurij Brězan, Cuno Hoffmeister, Anna Seghers, Andre Asriel, Erika Mann, Eduard Claudius
- 1952: Walter Arnold, Max Burghardt, Aenne Goldschmidt
- 1953: Eberhard Schmidt, Karl Max Schneider
- 1954: Friedrich Behrens, Max Burghardt, Eduard Maurer, Ehm Welk
- 1955: Ernst Bloch, Hans Marchwitza, Erwin Strittmatter, Ludwig Renn
- 1956: Theodor Brugsch, Fidelio F. Finke, Paula Hertwig
- 1957: Erich Engel Franz Fühmann, Friedrich Jung
- 1958: Bruno Apitz, Manfred von Ardenne
- 1959: Stefan Heym, Alfred Lemmnitz, Erwin Kramer, Walter Arnold, Kurt Barthel, Gret Palucca, Ludwig Deiters, Werner Bergmann, Anna Seghers, Robert Havemann, Will Lammert, Friedrich Eisenkolb, Wilhelm Unverzagt, Jan Petersen
- 1960: Karl Ewald Böhm, Werner Eggerath
- 1961: Helmut Baierl, Erich Brehm, Inge Keller, Ludwig Renn
- 1962: Edmund Collein
- 1963: Bruno Apitz, Horst Drinda, Gisela May, Werner Neumann
- 1964: Christa Wolf, Jurij Brězan, Harry Thürk, Hans Marchwitza
- 1965: Manfred von Ardenne, Wolf Kaiser
- 1966: Horst E. Brandt, Ernst Busch
- 1967: Theo Balden, Lea Grundig, Wolf Kaiser
- 1968: Lothar Bellag, Werner Bergmann, Wolf Kaiser, Manfred Krug, Konrad Wolf
- 1969: Alfred Kurella, Horst E. Brandt, Theo Adam, Otto Braun
- 1970: Helmut Baierl, Horst Drinda, Peter Edel, Johann Cilenšek
- 1971: Horst E. Brandt, Werner Bergmann, Horst Drinda, Kurt Böwe, Günter Caspar, Manfred Krug, Anna Seghers
- 1972: Curt Querner, Peter Schreier
- 1973: Hannelore Bey, Max Butting, Hermann Kant, Gisela May, Herbert Sandberg
- 1974: Peter Hacks, Hans Koch, Franz Fühmann, Jürgen Kuczynski, Kurt Sanderling, Frank Schöbel
- 1975: Frank Beyer, Jurek Becker
- 1976: Theo Balden, Jurij Brězan, Angelica Domröse, Hans Pischner, Hans-Günther Thalheim
- 1977: Peter Hacks, Inge Keller, Harry Thürk
- 1978: Ludwig Güttler
- 1979: Ernst Busch, Peter Damm
- 1980: Heiner Carow, Harry Paul
- 1981: Gret Palucca
- 1982: Puhdys, Kurt Masur
- 1983: Hermann Kant
- 1984: Karat (band), Lothar Kolditz, Reinhard Lakomy
- 1985: Kurt Demmler, Ludwig Güttler
- 1986: Heiner Müller
- 1987: Christa Wolf, Lothar Bellag, Ruth Berghaus
- 1988: Category Science and Technology: Research collective in Dresden (For development on the Megabit-Chip); Volker Braun
- 1989: Günter de Bruyn (turned down), Gerhard Schöne

== Bibliography ==
- Dietrich Herfurth (2006). Der Nationalpreis der DDR. Zur Geschichte einer deutschen Auszeichnung. Mit allen Preisträgern, Titeln und Tätigkeitsgebieten (in German). Selbstverl., Berlin.
- Taschenlexikon Orden und Medaillen Staatliche Auszeichnungen der DDR (in German). VEB Bibliographisches Institute Leipzig. 1983.
- Forschen und Wirken. Festschrift zur 150-Jahrfeier der Humboldt-Universität zu Berlin 1810-1960. Band 1, VEB Deutscher Verlag der Wissenschaften, Berlin 1960. S. XV Ehrentafel, Nationalpreisträger.
