= Marja Kubašec =

Sorbian writer

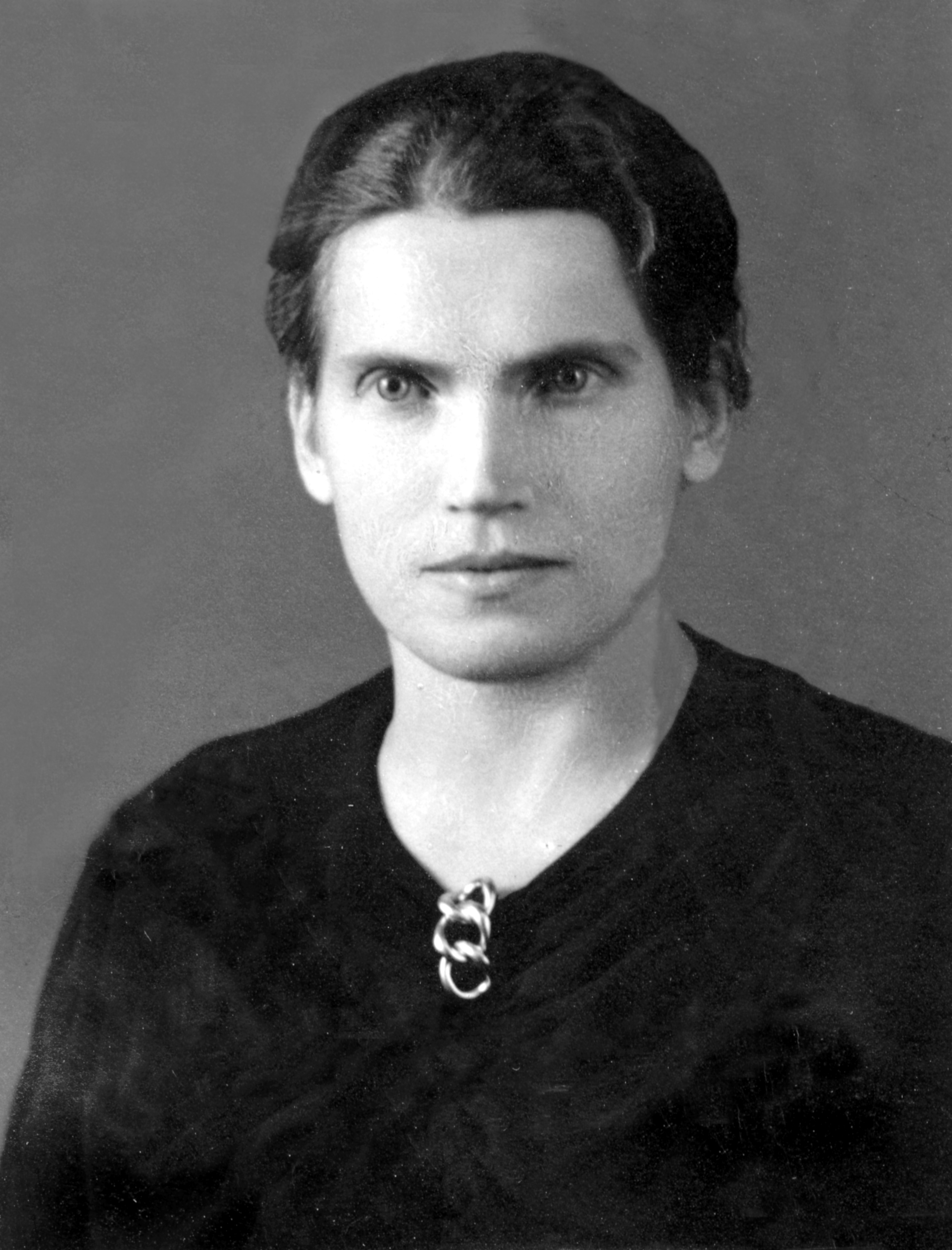
- Kubašec around 1930
- Born: 7 March 1890; Quoos, Kingdom of Saxony, German Empire
- Died: 13 April 1976 (aged 86); Bautzen, Bezirk Dresden, German Democratic Republic
- Writing career
- Language: Upper Sorbian
- Notable works: Row w serbskej holi (1949); Bosćij Serbin (1963–1965)
- Notable awards: Johannes-R.-Becher-Medaille (1975)
- Literary movement: Sorbian literature

Marja Kubašec (German: Maria Kubasch; 7 March 1890 – 13 April 1976) was a Sorbian writer who is considered by literary historians to be the first woman to write novels in Upper Sorbian. Working as a schoolteacher, she wrote theatre plays, short stories, biographies, and novels dealing with the history of the Sorbian people.

Born into a family of farmers in the Upper Lusatiam village of Quoos (now part of Radibor) in the Kingdom of Saxony, part of the German Empire, she completed her teacher training in 1911 with a focus on history and foreign languages at the Ursulinenkloster Erfurt. Save for a brief period after the Second World War, she taught in a succession of schools in Saxony until the end of her working life in 1956. During her retirement, Kubašec focused increasingly on her writing.

Her first literary production was Wusadny ('The Outcast'), a serial novella published in a newspaper between 1922 and 1923. She published her first dramatic work in 1926, a historical play entitled Chodojta ('The Witch'). A collection of short stories, Row w serbskej holi ('The Grave in the Sorbian Heath') appeared in 1949. The collection's eponymous story relates the execution of a Polish forced labourer who had fallen in love with a Sorbian woman during the war. Her later works include two biographies of Sorbian members of the resistance to the Third Reich. Her writings were honoured with several prizes, among which the 1975 Johannes-R.-Becher-Medaille.

== Life ==
Marja Kubašec was born in March 1890 in Quoos, a village near Bautzen in the Kingdom of Saxony (then part of the German Empire). Her parents were catholic farmers and members of the Sorbian minority, a West Slavic ethnic group living in the German-Polish border region of Lusatia. From 1902 to 1909, after attending a school in Radibor, she received her teacher training with a focus on history and foreign languages at the Ursulinenkloster Erfurt. She then moved to Duisburg, where she taught the children of impoverished factory workers. Kubašec was the first Sorbian woman to attain a full teacher's education. She was influenced during this period by the Sorbian writers Arnošt Muka and Ota Wićaz.

Having returned to Lusatia in 1911, she began teaching at a Sorbian school in Crostwitz, a position she held until 1925. While working in Crostwitz, she engaged in various literary pursuits: she would write an annual theatre play for her pupils, wrote articles for the Sorbian magazine Łužica, and edited the student journal Serbski student. In 1923, she translated Janota Wićaz a Czech-language play about a Sorbian forced labourer into Upper Sorbian. From 1925 to 1939, she taught at school in Pulsnitz. In 1933, after Adolf Hitler's rise to power, she followed her school's entire teaching staff in joining Hitler's Nazi Party. In 1939, she was transferred to a school in Großröhrsdorf; according to the journalist Andreas Kirschke, the transfer came about as a punishment for her rejection of the government's persecution of Jews and Sorbs.

After the end of the Second World War, Kubašec was suspended from her teaching post because of her membership in the Nazi Party and instead began working for Domowina, an organisation promoting the interest of the Sorbs. Her suspension ended in 1949 when she took up a post at a school in Bautzen. In 1952, she was appointed a lecturer for Sorbian and German literature at a Sorbian institute for teacher education at Radibor. She held this post until the end of her working life in 1956. Living in her hometown of Quoos, she devoted her retirement to writing. Kubašec died on 13 April 1976 in Bautzen.

== Literary work ==
When Kubašec returned from her stint in Duisburg, she joined Maćica Serbska, an organisation for the promotion of Sorbian cultural life. Through the company of many Sorbian intellectuals she became interested in choral music and theatre. Her first literary production was Wusadny ('The Outcast'), a serial novella published in the newspaper Lužica during 1922 and 1923. She published her first dramatic work for adults, a historical play entitled Chodojta ('The Witch') in 1926. She had presented the play at the 1925 Schadźowanka, a yearly gathering of Sorbian students. There followed a break in publishing until after the end of the Second World War.

After the war, her work focused on issues of the recent past and the history of the Sorbian people. In 1949, she published Row w serbskej holi ('The Grave in the Sorbian Heath'), a collection of short stories. The collection's eponymous story relates the execution of a Polish forced labourer who had fallen in love with a Sorbian woman during the war. In the 1960s, she engaged with the lives of two Sorbs who had resisted the government of Adolf Hitler: her biographies of the writer Maria Grollmuß (1960) and the catholic priest Alojs Andritzki (1967) went through several editions in Sorbian and German.

During her retirement, Kubašec published several narrative works. Her trilogy Bosćij Serbin ('Sebastian the Sorb', 1963–1965) follows the life of an illegal Sorbian schoolteacher in the 18th century. The topic of education also featured in a set of novels, Lěto wulkich wohenjow ('The Summer of the Great Fire', 1970) and Nalětnje wětry ('Spring Winds', 1978), about the origin of formal education among the Sorbs.

== Recognition ==
In 1962, Kubašec was awarded the Ćišinski Prize, an award given to those who work to promote the language, culture, and literature of the Sorbian people. After winning the literate prize of Domowina (1965), she was the 1975 recipient of the Johannes-R.-Becher-Medaille, given by the Cultural Association of the GDR. Kubašec is considered by literary historian as the first woman to write novels in Upper Sorbian, the language of the Sorbs in Germany.

== Bibliography ==
- Kirschke, Andreas (7 March 2015). "Den Aufbruch aus der Tradition gewagt". Sächsische Zeitung (in German).
- Scholze, Dietrich (8 October 2007). "Marja Kubašec (Maria Kubasch)". Sächsische Biografie (in German). Institut für Sächsische Geschichte und Volkskunde.
- Schönbach, Miriam (20 April 2020). "Das Grab in der Heide". Sächsische Zeit (in German).
- Wilson, Katharina, ed. (1991). "Marja Kubašec". An Encyclopedia of Continental Women Writers. Vol. 1. London: Garland Publishing. pp. 673–674. ISBN 978-0-8240-8547-6.
- Juršikowa, Ingrid (1984). "Kubjašec, Marja". In Jan, Šołta; Kunze, Peter; Šěn, Franc (eds.). Nowy biografiski słownik k stawiznam a kulturje Serbow (in Upper Sorbian). Bautzen: Ludowe nakładnistwo Domowina. pp. 315–17. OCLC 14214556.
