= Max Burghardt =

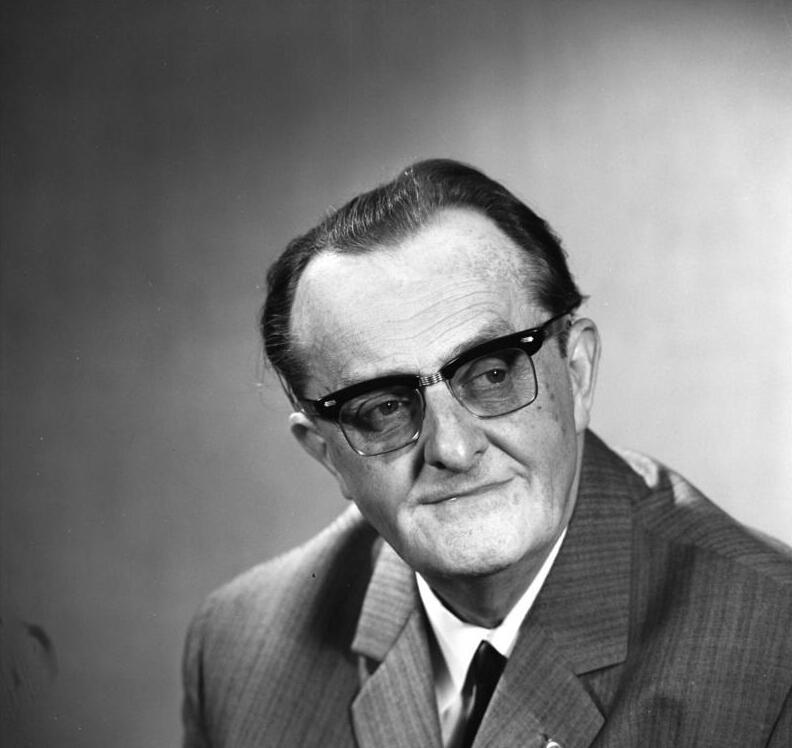
- Max Burghardt

President of the Cultural Association of the German Democratic Republic
- In office 1958–1977
- Preceded by: Johannes R. Becher
- Succeeded by: Hans Pischner

Personal details
- Born: November 27, 1893 Wickendorf, Schwerin, German Empire
- Died: January 22, 1977 (aged 83) East Berlin, German Democratic Republic
- Party: Socialist Unity Party of Germany (1946–); Communist Party of Germany (1930–1946)
- Spouse(s): Marianne Gornig; Charlotte Massenburg-Burghardt
- Education: Marxist Workers' School
- Awards: Patriotic Order of Merit, honour clasp (1973); Order of Karl Marx (1970 & 1968); Patriotic Order of Merit, in gold (1965 & 1963); National Prize of the German Democratic Republic (1959 & 1952); Patriotic Order of Merit, in silver (1955)
- Military Service
- Allegiance: German Empire
- Branch: Imperial German Army
- Conflicts: First World War

Max Burghardt (November 27, 1893 – January 22, 1977) was a German actor, director, and president of the Cultural Association of the GDR.

== Life ==
Burghardt was born in Wickendorf, Schwerin, where his maternal grandfather owned a small estate near Lake Schwerin. He lived there for about three to four years and then moved with his family to Berlin-Moabit. One of his school friends was Gustav von Wangenheim, who later also became known as an actor. Burghardt later stated that his first visit to the theater, to see the Friedrich Schiller play The Robbers at the Schiller Theater in Berlin, inspired him to become an actor.

Following his parents' divorce in 1910, Burghardt moved to Rostock. In Rostock he worked initially for an insurance company and later for a bookseller.

Burghardt studied at the Maria Moissi Acting School in Berlin from 1913 to 1914. At the acting school he adopted aspects of the acting style of Alexander Moissi.

At the beginning of the First World War, Burghardt volunteered for the Imperial German Navy in Kiel, but was rejected. Later, he volunteered for the 17th Dragoon Regiment in Ludwigslust and joined the cavalry. After basic training he was sent to the Eastern Front and fought on the Daugava. He was taken to a hospital with a knee injury and later transferred back to Ludwigslust. In the late autumn of 1917, he was transferred to the infantry, where he worked as a telephone operator at regimental headquarters and returned to the Eastern Front.

After the conclusion of the war, Burghardt resumed his acting career in Bremen, where he was hired as a trainee at the Bremen City Theatre. His first important role was as Mortimer in Mary Stuart at the Theater Lübeck. During this time he took acting lessons from Hermann Wlach, who worked in Hamburg.

In Plauen, Burghardt met the opera singer Charlotte Massenburg, whom he married a year later in Darmstadt. After the marriage, he acted predominantly in the Frankfurt region, in order to remain closer to his wife. The growing popularity of the Nazi Party begun to cause problems, especially for his wife, who was exposed to hostility on account of her Jewish heritage. Burghardt spent time in Berlin writing short stories and poetry.

In 1930, Burghardt and his wife became members of the Communist Party of Germany (KPD); they had previously been close to the party for a long time. The couple attended the Marxist Workers' School together; with their first teacher being Kurt Hager. In 1932 Burghardt returned to Frankfurt from Berlin to play the role of Hamlet at the Frankfurt Artists' Theater.

After the Nazi Party seized power in 1933, the theater scene in Germany changed dramatically. He continued to act in Frankfurt, and wrote radio plays during this time.

Burghardt sheltered political opponents of the Nazis, including Alexander Maaß and Max Opitz. He also undertook underground activities on behalf of the banned Communist Party of Germany; travelling to Basel and Zurich to make contact with Swiss communists.

On December 5, 1935, Burghardt was arrested by the Gestapo in Degerloch, on account of his association with Lilo Herrmann. He spent two years in prison awaiting trial. During his trial he was found not guilty of treason, which carried the death penalty. He was sentenced to four years and six months in prison on other charges. Burghardt was sent to the Ludwigsburg Prison to serve his sentence. However, after serving his sentence, he was not immediately released, instead being transferred to a prison camp in Welzheim. After about a year in Welzheim, he was released on April 6, 1941.

After the conclusion of the Second World War, Burghardt tried to get permission to run a cabaret stage in Bremen, but was rebuffed by the American occupation authorities.

Burghardt then had an opportunity to head a radio station in Stuttgart, but was prevented from doing so by American occupation authorities on account of his communist sympathies.

On February 10, 1946, Burghardt received a visit from his friend Alexander Maaß. Maaß had considerable influence with British occupation authorities and was able to offer Burghardt the directorship of Nordwestdeutscher Rundfunk (NWDR) radio station in Cologne. In 1946, Burghardt became a member of the Socialist Unity Party (SED).

Burghardt's appointment to the directorship of the Cologne NWDR radio station drew considerable criticism, particularly in conservative circles. Konrad Adenauer complained about the "red director" accusing the British occupation authorities of ignorance.

At the radio station, he was able to recruit Karl-Eduard von Schnitzler, Els Vordemberge, Karl Georg Egel, and Karl Gass. Burghardt's visit to a public rally by Wilhelm Pieck and Otto Grotewohl in Cologne on July 21, 1946, caused tension between him and British occupation authorities.

In 1946, Burghardt was able to premiere a play he had written during the war Judiths Sohn (trans. Judith's Son) in Stuttgart.

Despite the political tensions, Burghardt was considered for directorship of the Nordwestdeutscher Rundfunk, but ultimately not selected. Eventually, British occupation authorities became increasingly unsettled about the communist sympathies of both Burghardt and Karl-Eduard von Schnitzler. Due to this conflict, he resigned in late 1946.

After leaving Cologne, Friedrich Wolf brought him to Berlin. Wolf introduced Burghardt to Erich Weinert. Weinert hired Burghardt to oversee the postwar reconstruction of the theatre industry in the Soviet occupation zone. During this time, Burghardt was initially lived in the still damaged Hotel Adlon but later obtained an apartment in Niederschönhausen. He later brought his wife Charlotte, who had remained in Cologne but had since become ill with angina, to Berlin.

=== Intendant in Leipzig ===
In 1950, Burghardt was made general director of the Leipzig Municipal Theater at the suggestion of his friend Max Opitz, who was now mayor of Leipzig. In 1951, Burghardt became a member of the Academy of Arts.

The world premiere of Robespierre took place in Leipzig, directed by Arthur Jopp, with the president of the German Democratic Republic, Wilhelm Pieck, in attendance, accompanied by Otto Grotewohl and Max Opitz. Other notable performances include: The Maid of Orleans by Schiller, Die Flamme von Paris by Boris Asafyev, Wat Tyler by Alan Bush, Florian Geyer by Gerhart Hauptmann, and the Winterschlacht by Johannes R. Becher. The premiere of the Winterschlacht took place in February 1953 and was attended by Bertolt Brecht.

Paul Dessau's adaption of Friedrich Wolf's poem Die Studentin von Stuttgart was premiered in Leipzig under Burghardt. Many further plays by Wolf would be performed in the theater. These included: Die Matrosen von Cattario, Tai Yang erwacht, Der arme Konrad, and Bürgermeister Anna. The premiere of Der arme Konrad on October 1, 1953, was also the last theater performance that Wolf attended before he died on October 5, 1953.

=== Intendant of the German State Opera in Berlin ===
From 1954 to 1963, Burghardt was intendent of the Berlin State Opera. He was appointed by Johannes R. Becher, Minister of Culture of the German Democratic Republic. He replaced Henner Allmeroth. The State Opera building was still under construction, so the Admiralspalast served as a temporary venue.

Burghardt attempted to recruit Erich Kleiber as a conductor at the State Opera. Kleiber came to Berlin, but ultimately declined the role for political reasons. Franz Konwitschny became the new music director in Kleiber's place. Various other artists left the State Opera around this time, including Lovro von Matačić.

The rebuilt Berlin State Opera building was opened on September 4, 1955, with Iphigenia in Aulis. The performance of Wozzeck by Alban Berg was an early success for the opera. Other notable performances under Burghardt's tenure include: the Neue Odyssee by Robert Hanell, Der Revisor by Werner Egk, Krutnava by Eugon Suchon, Richard Wagner's Götterdämmerung, Werner Egk 's opera Peer Gynt was performed to mark his 60th birthday. The work had its premiere at the German State Opera in 1938.and Ottmar Gerster's The Witch of Passau, a dramatic opera ballad set during the Peasants' War.

In 1958, Burghardt became president of the Cultural Association of the German Democratic Republic, succeeding Johannes R. Becher. In 1959, he became a member of the Central Committee of the Socialist Unity Party.

On May 21, 1961, his wife Charlotte died of a stroke in Berlin.

The construction of the Berlin Wall in 1961 imposed challenges for the opera. Around 200 employees residing in West Berlin terminated their contracts. Although the employees could still cross into East Berlin after the construction of the wall, their salaries could no longer be converted from East German marks into West German marks. Despite these challenges, the opera was still able to proceed with a November 22, 1961, performance of Fidelio.

Facing increasing health problems, Burghardt asked the then minister of culture Hans Bentzien to release him from directorship of the State Opera; to allow him to concentrate exclusively on his role as president of the Cultural Association. Burghardt ultimately left his position at the State Opera in 1963, with his recommendation for successor, Hans Pischner, holding the role until 1988.

Around this time, Burghardt married Marianne Gornig, whom he had met in the 1950s when she was mayor of Ottendorf-Okrilla. Upon his death in 1977, he was succeeded as president of the Cultural Association of the GDR by Hans Pischner.

== Awards ==
- Patriotic Order of Merit, honour clasp (1973)
- Order of Karl Marx (1970 & 1968)
- Patriotic Order of Merit, in gold (1965 & 1963)
- National Prize of the German Democratic Republic (1959 & 1952)
- Patriotic Order of Merit, in silver (1955)

== Selected works ==
- Burghardt, Max (1972). Ich war nicht nur Schauspieler. Erinnerungen eines Theatermannes. Weimar: Buchclub 65. ISBN 978-3351010430
- — (1968). Fürchtet euch nicht. Berlin: Verlag Neues Leben.
- — (1967). Briefe, die nie geschrieben wurden. Berlin: Verlag Neues Leben.
