= Gisin =

Gisin or GISIN may refer to:

- Global Invasive Species Information Network
- Michelle Gisin (born 1993), Swiss alpine skier
- Dominique Gisin (born 1985), Swiss alpine skier
- Marc Gisin (born 1988), Swiss alpine skier
- Nicolas Gisin (born 1952), Swiss physicist
- Hermann Gisin, Swiss zoologist

== See also ==
- Gysi, a surname
- Gysin (disambiguation)
