= Karl Böhm (disambiguation) =

Karl Böhm (1894–1981) was an Austrian conductor.

Karl Böhm may also refer to:

- Karl Böhm (art director) (1882–1942), German art director
- Karl Bohm (footballer) (born 1995), Swedish footballer
- Karl Ewald Böhm (1913–1977), East German writer
- Karlheinz Böhm (1928–2014), sometimes referred to as Karl Boehm, Austrian-German actor and philanthropist
- Carl Crack (1971–2001), German techno artist
