= Baierl =

Baierl is a surname. Notable people with the surname include:

- Helmut Baierl (1926–2005), German playwright
- Lotte Baierl (1928–2015), Austrian underwater diver, model, and actress
