= Nathan Notowicz =

German musicologist and composer

Nathan "Noto" Notowicz (31 July 1911 – 15 April 1968) was a German musicologist and composer.

== Leben ==
Born in Tyczyn, Notowicz was the son of a merchant. The family moved to Munich in 1913, where Notowicz attended primary schools. In Düsseldorf he studied at the conservatory, among others musicology with Ernst Bücken and composition with Hermann Unger, and became a teacher for music theory in 1932. After the Machtergreifung by the Nazis, he emigrated to Amsterdam in 1933, where he studied with Willem Andriessen and Stefan Askenase and worked as a music teacher and musician. At the same time, he was active in the communist resistance in Holland; in 1940 he joined the KPD and was head of the KPD group in Holland in 1944/45 under the alias "Gerard Fischer".

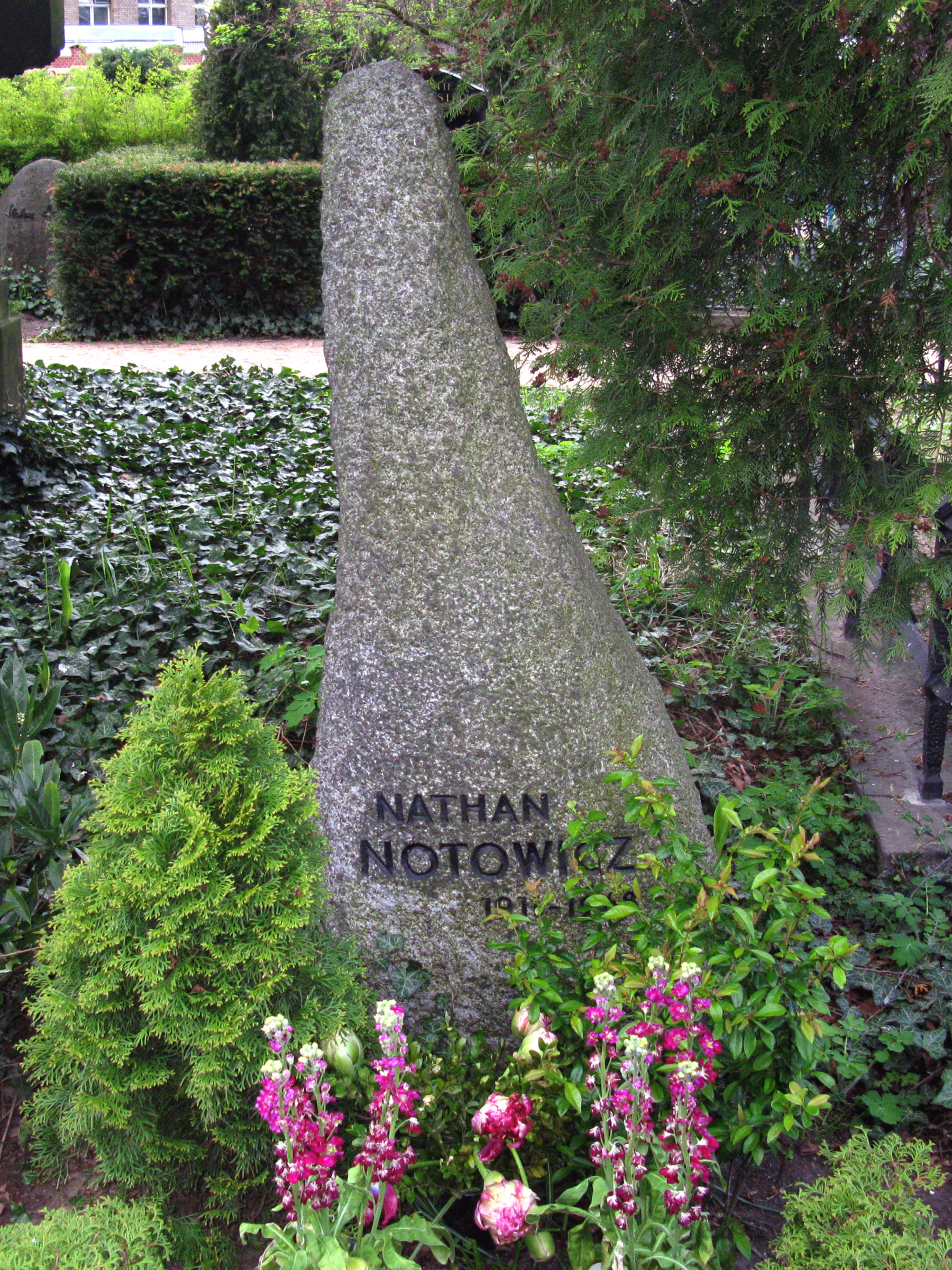
Notowicz's grave at the Berlin Dorotheenstadt Cemetery

In 1946, he returned to Germany. First he worked as a KPD functionary in Düsseldorf; in 1948, he moved to the Soviet occupation zone in the DDR founded the following year, he worked as a musicologist and composer. In 1950, he became professor of music history and vice-rector of the newly founded Hochschule für Musik "Hanns Eisler" in East Berlin. Along with the founding rector of the university, Georg Knepler, his professorial colleague Harry Goldschmidt, the editor-in-chief of the journal Musik und Gesellschaft, Eberhard Rebling, and the professor of music sociology at the Humboldt University of Berlin, Ernst Hermann Meyer, Notowicz was one of the leading Marxist musicologists of the young GDR.

At the same time, he distinguished himself as an association functionary: The GDR Composers' Association Verband der Komponisten und Musikwissenschaftler der DDR (VDK) headed the SED-member Notowicz as First Secretary since its foundation in April 1951. In the Musikrat der DDR founded on 9 May 1962, Notowicz was elected Secretary General; the President was Hanns Eisler. Notowicz was also a member of the presidency of the Cultural Association of the GDR. In June 1964, he became president of the newly founded Freundschaftsgesellschaft DDR-Belgien.

After Hanns Eisler's death, Notowicz promoted the founding of the Hanns Eisler Archive at the Academy of Arts, Berlin in 1963. The archive, managed by Notowicz, aimed to publish a scholarly and critical complete edition; the first volume of the Gesammelte Werke (EGW) was a volume of music completed by Notowicz shortly before his death in 1968. As early as January 1958 (and thus before Eisler's better-known conversations with Hans Bunge), Notowicz had conducted several lengthy conversations with Eisler for the Rundfunk der DDR, which appeared in book form in 1971.

His wife Ann Notowicz was a staff member of the Women's International Democratic Federation and later chairman of the Komitee der Antifaschistischen Widerstandskämpfer in Berlin-Köpenick.

Notowicz died in East-Berlin at the age of 57.

== Awards ==
- 1956 Preis für künstlerisches Volksschaffen II. Classe
- 1959 Patriotic Order of Merit in Silver
- 1961 Johannes-R.-Becher-Medaille
- Medal for Fighters Against Fascism

== Publications ==
- (as editor) Alexander Serov: Aufsätze zur Musikgeschichte. Aufbau-Verlag, Berlin 1955 (translated byFelix Loesch)
- Erlebnisse in der Sowjetunion. Komponisten und Musikwissenschaftler der Deutschen Demokratischen Republik berichten von ihrer Studienreise. Gesellschaft für Deutsch-Sowjetische Freundschaft, Berlin 1955 (with Walther Vetter, Ottmar Gerster, Walther Siegmund-Schultze and Ernst Hermann Meyer)
- (as editor with Jürgen Elsner) Hanns Eisler: Quellennachweise. On behalf of the Hanns Eisler Archive at the German Academy of Arts in Berlin. Deutscher Verlag für Musik, Leipzig 1966
- (as editor) Hanns Eisler: Gesammelte Werke, Serie 1, vol. 18: Neue deutsche Volkslieder, Chansons, Kinder- und Jugendlieder. Deutscher Verlag für Musik, Leipzig 1968
- Wir reden hier nicht von Napoleon. Wir reden von Ihnen! Gespräche mit Hanns Eisler und Gerhart Eisler. Verlag Neue Musik, Berlin 1971 (übertragen und kommentiert von Jürgen Elsner)
