= Friedrich Eisenkolb =

- Born: 5 January 1901; Warnsdorf, Bohemia, Austria-Hungary
- Died: 29 September 1967 (aged 66); Dresden, East Germany
- Occupations: Metallurgist; University professor
- Political party: NSDAP (1940-1945)

Friedrich Eisenkolb (5 January 1901 – 29 September 1967) was a German metallurgist.

== Life ==
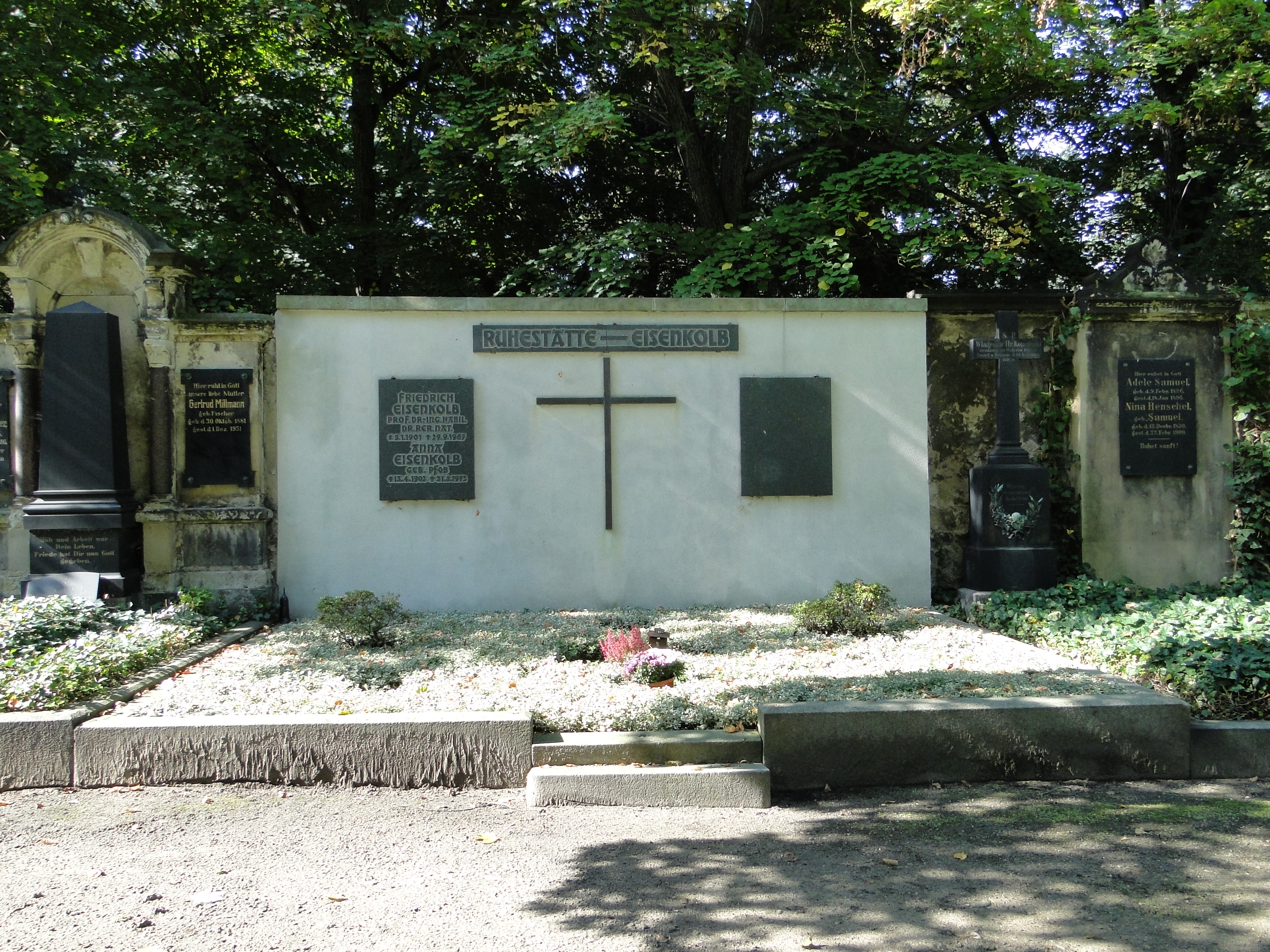
Eisenkolb's grave in the New Catholic Cemetery in Dresden

Eisenkolb was born at the start of the twentieth century in Warnsdorf, at that time a small German-speaking town in northern Bohemia. His father was employed in finance security. Eisenkolb passed his School final exams in 1919 and then, from 1919 till 1923, studied Chemistry and Metallurgy at the Prague Poly-technical Institute. He received his doctorate in 1924 and went to work for Eisenwerke AG at Rothau-Neudek, on the Bohemian side of the Western Ore Mountains. (Bohemia had in 1918 become part of a newly created country called Czechoslovakia.) In 1928 Eisenkolb completed a second dissertation, his subject being the pickling of sheet-metals. In 1931 he took over as head of Quality, Research and Testing at the AG Karlshütten steel mill in Leskovec. In 1937 he obtained a further academic qualification (habilitation) from the Prague Poly-technical Institute. His dissertation again concerned itself with the properties of sheet-metals. He now took a teaching professorship, and also headed up the Research and Testing institute at the Iron and Steel works at Thale in Saxony which is where he was evidently based from 1939. In the meantime the political landscape had changed, with a single-Party dictatorship established in Germany in 1933. Frontiers shifted and Bohemia was forcibly integrated into Germany, starting in 1938 with the predominantly speaking German-speaking borderlands and ending during 1939 with the entire province integrated into Germany. Friedrich Eisenkolb became a member of the country's ruling Nazi party in 1940.

War, which had broken out in 1939, ended in defeat for Nazi Germany in May 1945. A large chunk in the centre of what had previously been Germany, including Saxony, was now designated as the Soviet occupation zone. In October 1949 the Soviet administered zone was refounded as the Soviet sponsored German Democratic Republic. 1949 was also the year in which Friedrich Eisenkolb was appointed Professor for Materials sciences at the Dresden University of Technology. It was a post he would retain till his retirement seventeen years later. In 1953 he was elected a full member of the Berlin-based German Academy of Sciences.

Friedrich Eisenkolb died in Dresden at the end of September 1967, aged only 66. He was buried in the city's New Catholic Cemetery.

== Published output ==
Friedrich Eisenkolb's name became widely known in the German Democratic Republic thanks to his multi-volume work, "Introduction to Materials Sciences" ("Einführung in die Werkstoffkunde").

== Awards and honours ==
- 1959: National Prize of East Germany for Science and Technology: Class II
- 1961: Patriotic Order of Merit in silver
