= State Secretary for Church Affairs =

Former political office in the German Democratic Republic

The State Secretary for Church Affairs (German: Staatssekretär für Kirchenfragen) was the head of the Secretariat for Church Affairs in the former German Democratic Republic. The office was responsible for the relationship of the government toward churches and religious groups. Policy was set by the ruling Socialist Unity Party (SED), but direct contact with the churches and religious groups was essentially restricted to the Secretariat in order to preserve the SED's stance as atheist and anti-religion.

== Establishment and function ==
The office was established in 1957 following the example of the Soviet Union and other communist countries. The SED's goal was to prevent religious involvement in state affairs, particularly with regard to education and training of children and young people. The Secretary was responsible for maintaining the relationship between government and the churches and religious groups, but was kept weak with no power to set policy. Policy towards religion was set by the SED, whose leaders rarely met with religious leaders. This arrangement allowed the SED to maintain its appearance as an "atheistic party against the Church". However, it also created a situation where, not having direct contact with the churches, the party was forced to rely on other's reports for what was actually going on with the churches, reports that often minimized or omitted serious criticism of the communist government "in order to avoid excited or angry decisions, or to confirm the predominant picture among the recipients of the report of harmonious societal development."

In addition to maintaining relationships with the churches, the Secretary was to ensure that the laws and ordinances kept pace with the development of the socialist state. The SED expected religion to die out over time and sought to restrict the churches to conducting rites and services. Church representatives viewed the office as the "State Secretariat Against Church Affairs" (German: Staatssekretariat gegen kirchliche Angelegenheiten).

== Control and persecution ==
A list, based on religions recognized by the post-war Soviet Military Administration was drawn up by the Ministry of the Interior. Those that were on the list were allowed to hold church services, though there were waves of persecution in 1953 and 1958, including arrests of ministers and others, and show trials.

Two religions were kept off the list, Jehovah's Witnesses and Christian Science. Jehovah's Witnesses were denied approval based on their "rejection of secular authority". Christian Science was denied because of the religion's affiliation with the United States and a Nazi-era law related to medical practice. Christian Science was later granted official recognition in November 1989, just prior to the fall of the Berlin Wall.

== State Secretaries ==
- 1957-1960: Werner Eggerath
- 1960-1979: Hans Seigewasser
- 1979-1988: Klaus Gysi
- 1988-1989: Kurt Löffler
- 1989-1990: Lothar de Maizière
