= Werner Bergmann =

German sociologist (born 1950)

Werner Bergmann (born 26 May 1950, Celle, West Germany) is a German sociologist. He is Professor of Sociology at the Center for Research on Antisemitism at Technische Universität Berlin.

Bergmann's work focuses on sociology and history of antisemitism and related areas, including racism and right-wing extremism. He has published on the theory of social movements, forms of collective violence (pogroms, genocides) and on prejudice.

In their 1997 book, Anti-Semitism and Xenophobia in Germany after Unification, Bergmann and Erb put forward the idea of secondary antisemitism, a privately held antisemitic world view common among post-war citizens of West Germany that remained latent but increased in strength because it was denied a public expression.

== Selected publications ==
- The time structures of social systems, a system-theoretical analysis . Duncker und Humblot, Berlin 1981, ISBN 3-428-04857-1 (= Soziologische Schriften, Band 33, zugleich Dissertation Uni Hamburg, Fachbereich Philosophie und Sozialwissenschaften, 1981).
- Duncker and Humblot, Berlin 1981, ISBN 3-428-04857-1 (= Sociological writings , Volume 33, at the same time dissertation University of Hamburg, Department of Philosophy and Social Sciences, 1981).
- mit Rainer Erb: Die Nachtseite der Judenemanzipation.
- Rainer Erb: The Dark Side of Jewish emancipation.
- Der Widerstand gegen die Integration der Juden in Deutschland 1780–1860, Metropol, Berlin 1989, ISBN 3-926893-77-X (= Antisemitismus und jüdische Geschichte, 1989, Band 1).
- The resistance to the integration of Jews in Germany 1780-1860, Metropol, Berlin 1989, ISBN 3-926893-77-X (= anti-Semitism and Jewish history, 1989, Volume 1 ).
- als Herausgeber mit Rainer Erb: Antisemitismus in der politischen Kultur seit 1945, Westdeutscher Verlag, Opladen 1990, ISBN 3-531-11923-0.
- As editor with Rainer Erb: anti-Semitism in the political culture since 1945 , West German publishing house, Opladen 1990, ISBN 3-531-11923-0.
- als Herausgeber miz Rainer Erb: Neonazismus und rechte Subkultur (= Technische Universität Berlin. Zentrum für Antisemitismusforschung: Reihe Dokumente, Texte, Materialien, Band 15), Metropol, Berlin 1994, ISBN 3-926893-24-9.
- As editor miz Rainer Erb: neo-Nazism and right subculture (= University of Berlin Center for Research on Antisemitism. Series documents, texts, materials , Volume 15), metropolitan, Berlin 1994, ISBN 3-926893-24-9.
- Antisemitismus in öffentlichen Konflikten.
- Anti-Semitism in public conflicts. Kollektives Lernen in der politischen Kultur der Bundesrepublik 1949-1989 (= Schriftenreihe des Zentrums für Antisemitismusforschung Berlin, Band 4), Campus, Frankfurt am Main 1997, ISBN 3-593-35765-8 (Habilitationsschrift an der Freien Universität Berlin 1995/96 unter dem Titel: Öffentliche Konflikte und kollektive Lernprozesse). Collective learning in the political culture of the Federal Republic 1949-1989 (= Series of the Center for Research on Antisemitism Berlin , Volume 4), Campus, Frankfurt am Main 1997, ISBN 3-593-35765-8 (habilitation thesis at the Free University Berlin 1995/96 under the title: Public conflicts and collective learning processes ).
- Anti-Semitism and Xenophobia in Germany after Unification, mit Rainer Erb (Hrsg.), Oxford University Press, Oxford 1997, ISBN 0-19-511010-2 (englisch).
- Anti-Semitism and Xenophobia in Germany after Unification , with Rainer Erb (ed.), Oxford University Press, Oxford 1997, ISBN 0-19-511010-2 (English).
- mit Rainer Erb: Antisemitismus in der Bundesrepublik Deutschland 1996, in: Richard Alba, Peter Schmidt, Martina Wasmer (Hrsg.): Deutsche und Ausländer: Freunde, Fremde oder Feinde
- Rainer Erb: anti-Semitism in the Federal Republic of Germany in 1996 , in: Richard Alba, Peter Schmidt, Martina Wasmer (ed.): German and foreign Friends, strangers or enemies? Empirische Befunde und theoretische Erklärungen (= Blickpunkt Gesellschaft, Band 5), Westdeutscher Verlag, Opladen / Wiesbaden 2000, S. 401–438, ISBN 978-3-531-13491-8. Empirical findings and theoretical explanations' '(=' 'viewpoint society', Volume 5), West German publishing house, Opladen / Wiesbaden 2000, pp 401–438, ISBN 978-3-531-13491-8.
- Exclusionary Violence. Antisemitic Riots in Modern German History (1819-1938), Ann Arbor 2002, ed. zus. mit Christhard Hoffmann und HW Smith
- Geschichte des Antisemitismus, CH Beck, München 2002, ISBN 978-3406479878 (2. Auflage 2004, 3. Auflage 2006). zus. with Christhard Hoffmann and HW Smith
- als Herausgeber mit Mona Körte: Antisemitismusforschung in den Wissenschaften, Tagungsband, Metropol, Berlin 2004, ISBN 978-3-936411-48-5.
- as editor with Mona Körte: anti-Semitism research in the sciences , Proceedings, Metropol, Berlin 2004, ISBN 978-3-936411-48-5.
