= Wilfried Maaß =

German politician (1931–2005)

Wilfried Maaß (22 September 1931–23 December 2005) was a German politician. He was the secretary of Science, Education, and Culture in the Frankfurt/Oder district leadership of the Socialist Unity Party of Germany 1962–1966. In 1966, he became deputy minister of culture of the German Democratic Republic. Between 1968 and 1972, he was a member of the presidium council of Kulturbund. In 1984 he left his ministerial position to become its secretary.
