= Paul Collaer =

Belgian musicologist, pianist and conductor

Paul Collaer (8 June 1891 – 10 December 1989) was a Belgian musicologist, pianist, and conductor of Flemish background who was born in Boom and died in Brussels. Through concerts and radio broadcastings, he played an important role in the popularization of 20th century music in Belgium. An early proponent of period instruments practice, he dedicated his last years to ethnomusicology.

== Life ==
Collaer was born in a musical family. His parents, teachers and music lovers, raised him in Mechelen where he studied piano and harmony at the local music school (later renamed a conservatory). He also studied chemistry, receiving a doctorate from the Université libre de Bruxelles (1909-1914).
Collaer was an avid follower of Belgian musical life, attending operas at the theatre of La Monnaie, and concerts at the Concerts du Conservatoire, the Concerts Ysaÿe, and the Concerts Populaires. From 1911, encouraged by his piano teacher Émile Bosquet, who was an early music lover, Collaer gave a dozen lecture-recitals focused on that repertoire.
During the War, he was drafted and assigned to a surveillance position on the Yser river, but he developed pneumonia and was evacuated to Davos in 1917. There he met Ferruccio Busoni and Karol Szymanowski, played chamber music with the Rosé Quartet and accompanied the violinist Joseph Szigeti. In Davos he also met Elsa Meyer, whom he married in 1919, on the day when his return to Belgium was officially approved.
In 1919, Paul Collaer attended a series of lectures given by Jean Cocteau in Brussels about new poets and new musicians. There he met Darius Milhaud with whom he would maintain a long friendship. For some years, Collaer served as supervisor at secondary schools in Ixelles, and later as professor of chemistry in Mechelen.
In 1920, he resumed his lecture-recitals interrupted in 1914 because of the war. The new programs featured more contemporary music, including works by Francis Poulenc, Darius Milhaud, Georges Auric, Maurice Delage, and Igor Stravinski.
A strong advocate of modern music (particularly from France), he founded in 1921 in Brussels the Pro-Arte concerts. Musical Director of the Flemish station at Belgian Radio from 1937 to 1953, he spent his last years mainly into ethnomusicological research. Under his influence, the Cercle International d'études ethno-musicologiques was founded.
He also published many works on 20th-century music.

He died, aged 98, in Brussels.

== The Elsa and Paul Collaer Collection ==
The Elsa and Paul Collaer Collection, housed in the Music Division of the Royal Library of Belgium, is the result of three decades of donations and purchases that began in 1972 with the collaboration of Paul Collaer himself. The collection contains some 300 books, 400 off-prints and magazines, 1,140 printed and handwritten scores, 5,000 letters, 650 concert programmes and 900 33 RPM and 78 RPM discs as well as manuscripts, iconographic documents, press-clippings, paintings and reel-to-reel tapes. The Collaer collection is an important source of information on the musician and on musical life in Belgium during the 20th century.

== Works ==
- Stravinski (Brussels, 1930)
- Signification de la musique (Brussels, 1944)
- Darius Milhaud (Antwerp/Paris, 1947)
- La Musique moderne (Paris/Brussels, 1955 & 1963)
- Orientaciones actuales de la musica (Buenos Aires, 1961)
- Il Gruppo dei « Sei », in L'Approdo Musical 19-20, Éd. RAI (Rome, 1965)
- Ozeanien, in Musikgeschichte in Bildern Band I/1 (Leipzig, 1965)
- Amerika, in Musikgeschichte in Bildern Band I/2 (Leipzig, 1965)
- La musique populaire traditionnelle en Belgique (Brussels, 1974)
- Südostasien, in Musikgeschichte in Bildern Band I/3 (Leipzig, 1979)
- Darius Milhaud (Geneva, 1982)
- Nordafrika (with Jürgen Elsner), in Musikgeschichte in Bildern Band I/8 (Leipzig, 1979)

=== Archives Paul Collaer ===
- Inventaire des Archives Paul Collaer conservées au Musée royal de l’Afrique centrale

=== Bibliography ===
- Dictionnaire de la musique, Marc Honegger, Bordas, 1993
- Yves Lenoir (éd.), Le fonds Paul et Elsa Collaer. Un choix de cent documents, catalogue de l'exposition organisée à la Bibliothèque royale de Belgique du 4 février au 11 mars 2000, Bruxelles, Bibliothèque royale de Belgique, 2000, 207 p.
- Paul Collaer, Correspondance avec des amis musiciens, présentée et commentée par Robert Wangermée (éd. Mardaga, Bruxelles, 1996, 480 pages)
- Modern Style — Les souvenirs de Paul Collaer, série de six émissions réalisées par Joseph Benedek, RTBF, 1972
- Au bonheur des musiciens. 150 ans de vie musicale à Bruxelles, collectif, éditions Lannoo, 1997, 288 pages.
