= Werner Eggerath =

East German politician (1900–1977)

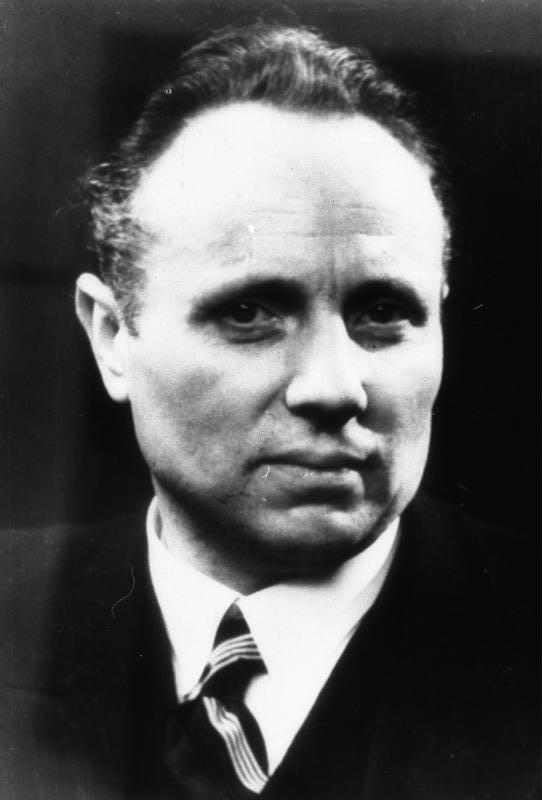
- Eggerath in 1950

State Secretary for Church Affairs
- In office 1957–1960

Ambassador of the German Democratic Republic to Romania
- In office 1954–1957
- Preceded by: Georg Ulrich Handke
- Succeeded by: Georg Stibi

Minister-President of Thuringia
- In office September 2, 1947 – July 23, 1952

Personal details
- Born: March 16, 1900 Elberfeld, German Empire
- Died: June 16, 1977 (aged 77) East Berlin, German Democratic Republic
- Resting place: Zentralfriedhof Friedrichsfelde
- Party: Socialist Unity Party of Germany (1946–); Communist Party of Germany (1924–1946)
- Education: International Lenin School
- Awards: Order of Karl Marx (1975); Patriotic Order of Merit Honor clasp, in Gold (1970); Patriotic Order of Merit Gold, 1st Class (1965); National Prize of the German Democratic Republic (1960); Banner of Labor (1960); Medal for Fighters Against Fascism (1958); Patriotic Order of Merit Silver, 2nd class (1955)

Military service
- Allegiance: Ruhr Red Army (1920); German Empire (1918–1919)
- Battles/wars: Ruhr Uprising; World War One

Werner Eggerath (16 March 1900 – 16 June 1977) was an East German author and communist politician. He was a member of the Socialist Unity Party of Germany (SED / Sozialistische Einheitspartei Deutschlands) and its first secretary in Thuringia from 21 April 1946 to 1947, already having held that position in the Communist Party of Germany before its merger with the SPD, to create, in April 1946, the SED. After having been Minister of the Interior of Thuringia since May 1947, he became its Minister-President on 9 October 1947, which he stayed until 23 July 1952 when the state was abolished. Eggerath also served as Ambassador to Romania from 1954 to 1957 and as the State Secretary for Church Affairs.
