= Klaus Gysi =

German politician (1912–1999)

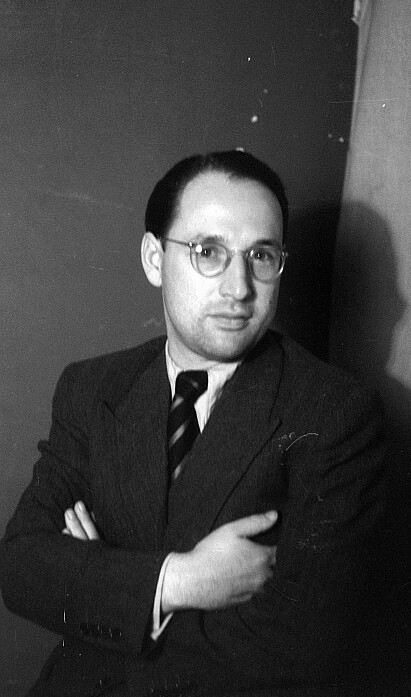
- Gysi in 1946

State Secretary for Church Affairs
- In office November 1979 – July 1988
- Chairman of the Council of Ministers: Willi Stoph
- Deputy: Hermann Kalb
- Preceded by: Hans Seigewasser
- Succeeded by: Kurt Löffler

East German Ambassador to Italy
- In office 1973–1978
- Minister: Oskar Fischer
- Preceded by: Eckhard Bibow (as envoy)
- Succeeded by: Hans Voß

Minister of Culture
- In office 12 January 1966 – 31 January 1973
- Chairman of the Council of Ministers: Willi Stoph
- Preceded by: Hans Bentzien
- Succeeded by: Hans-Joachim Hoffmann
Volkskammer
Member of the Volkskammer for Arnstadt, Apolda, Weimar-Stadt, Weimar-Land (Sondershausen, Nordhausen; 1967-1971)
In office 2 July 1967 – 5 April 1990
| Preceded by | multi-member district |
| Succeeded by | Constituency abolished |
In office 7 October 1949 – 17 October 1954
| Preceded by | Constituency established |
| Succeeded by | multi-member district |

Personal details
- Born: 3 March 1912 Berlin, Kingdom of Prussia, German Empire (now Germany)
- Died: 6 March 1999 (aged 87) Berlin, Germany
- Party: Party of Democratic Socialism (1990–1999)
- Other political affiliations: Socialist Unity Party (1946–1990); Communist Party of Germany (1931–1946)
- Children: 7, including Gregor Gysi
- Occupation: Politician; Journalist
- Awards: Order of Karl Marx

Klaus Gysi (3 March 1912 – 6 March 1999) was a German journalist, publisher, and politician who served as Minister of Culture from 1966 to 1973, and from 1979 to 1988, as the State Secretary for Church Affairs of the German Democratic Republic.

In his functions, he was jointly responsible for monitoring and influencing cultural and church activities in the GDR, in close cooperation with the Stasi and censorship editors.

During his youth in the Weimar Republic, Gysi was heavily involved in the Communist Party of Germany (KPD), and later an active member of the German resistance against Nazi Germany. After World War II, he became a prominent politician in East Germany's Socialist Unity Party (SED) and was one of its longest-serving members until German reunification. His son is the German politician Gregor Gysi.

== Biography ==
=== Early life ===
Gysi was born in Neukölln, Berlin, to a middle-class family. His father was Hermann Gysi (1888–1950), a local doctor whose family originated in Switzerland, and his mother was Erna Potolowsky (1893–1966), a bookkeeper of Jewish descent from Weilburg. He attended grade school and Realgymnasium in Neukölln and in 1928, joined the Young Communist League of Germany, the Workers International Relief and the Sozialistischer Schülerbund. He received his Abitur from the Odenwaldschule in Darmstadt in 1931, and that same year, joined the Communist Party (KPD). From 1931 to 1935, he studied social economics in Frankfurt am Main, the Sorbonne in Paris, and in Berlin.

=== Resistance against the Nazis ===
He became active in the left-wing students' movement in 1931. Following Adolf Hitler's rise to power, Gysi was expelled from Humboldt University of Berlin in 1935. He went to Cambridge, England, in 1936 and later, to Paris, France, where in 1939, he became one of the student leaders of the Communist Party there. He was then detained in France from 1939 to 1940 and evaded detection by German authorities following the invasion of France. The same year, Gysi was sent to Germany in order to conduct covert operations for the KPD, under party functionary Jens König. In Berlin, Gysi worked at the publisher Hoppenstedt & Co. while acting in the antifascist underground. During this time, Gysi's maternal uncle and aunt were killed in Auschwitz concentration camp in 1943. In 1945, he married his companion Irene Lessing, who had been his long-time girlfriend and party colleague since 1935.

=== Career ===
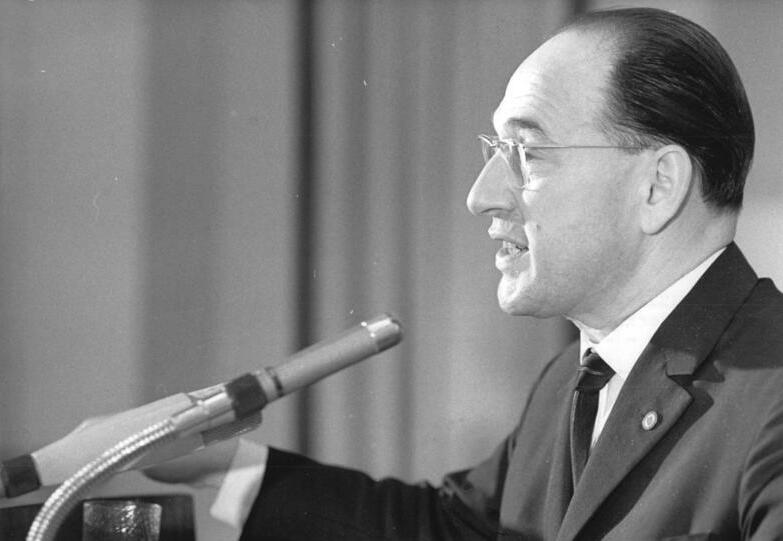
Gysi in 1966, speaking at the German Writers Union conference.

After the war, Gysi joined the SED. From 1945 to 1948, he was the editor-in-chief of the monthly Aufbau: Kulturpolitische Monatsschrift. From 1945 to 1977, he was a member of the presidium council, the federal secretary and lastly, a member of the presidium of the Cultural Association of the GDR. From 1949 to 1954, he was a representative in the GDR's parliament, the People's Chamber. From 1952 to 1957, he worked at the publishing house Verlag Volk und Wissen, afterward succeeding Walter Janka as head of Aufbau-Verlag, working there until 1966.

In 1963, Gysi became a member of the West Commission of the Politburo of the SED's Central Committee. From January 1966 to 1973, he was the Minister for Culture, a member of the Council of Ministers of East Germany and the Culture Commission of the Central Committee's Politburo. From 1967 to March 1990, he again served as a representative in the People's Chamber.

From 1973 to 1978, Gysi was ambassador to Italy, and a diplomat in Vatican City and Malta. From December 1978 to 1979, he was the General Secretary of the GDR's Committee for European Security and Cooperation, which prepared for GDR's participation in the Helsinki Accords. In November 1979 Gysi succeeded Hans Seigewasser as the State Secretary for Church Affairs, remaining in this position until his retirement in 1988. After the Fall of the Berlin Wall, Gysi became a member of the Party of Democratic Socialism (PDS) in 1990.

== Personal ==
Gysi was married three times and had seven children. His first wife, Irene (née Lessing) (1912–2007) was the sister of Gottfried Lessing, and sister-in-law of Doris Lessing. They divorced in 1958. Their daughter, Gabriele Gysi (*1946), is an actress. She moved to the former West Germany in 1985. Their son Gregor (*1948), a lawyer, was head of the Party of Democratic Socialism from 1989 to 1993 and is today one of the most prominent politicians in Germany's Left Party. Gysi died in Johannistal, Berlin.

== Recognition and honors ==
In 1969, Gysi was awarded the Banner of Labor; in 1970, he received the Memorial Medal of the Ministerium für Staatssicherheit and the Lenin Memorial Medal. In 1972, he was awarded the Patriotic Order of Merit; in 1977, the Order of Karl Marx; and in 1982, he received the honor clasp of the Patriotic Order of Merit. In 1987, he was awarded the Star of People's Friendship and received an honorary degree from the University of Jena.

Political offices
| Preceded by Hans Bentzien | Minister of Culture, (GDR); 1966-1973 | Succeeded by Hans-Joachim Hoffmann |
| Preceded by Hans Siegewasser | State Secretary for Church Affairs; 1979-1988 | Succeeded by Kurt Löffler |
Diplomatic posts
| Preceded by | Ambassador to Italy; 1973-1978 | Succeeded by Hans Voß |
