= Jürgen Elsner =

German music ethnologist and author

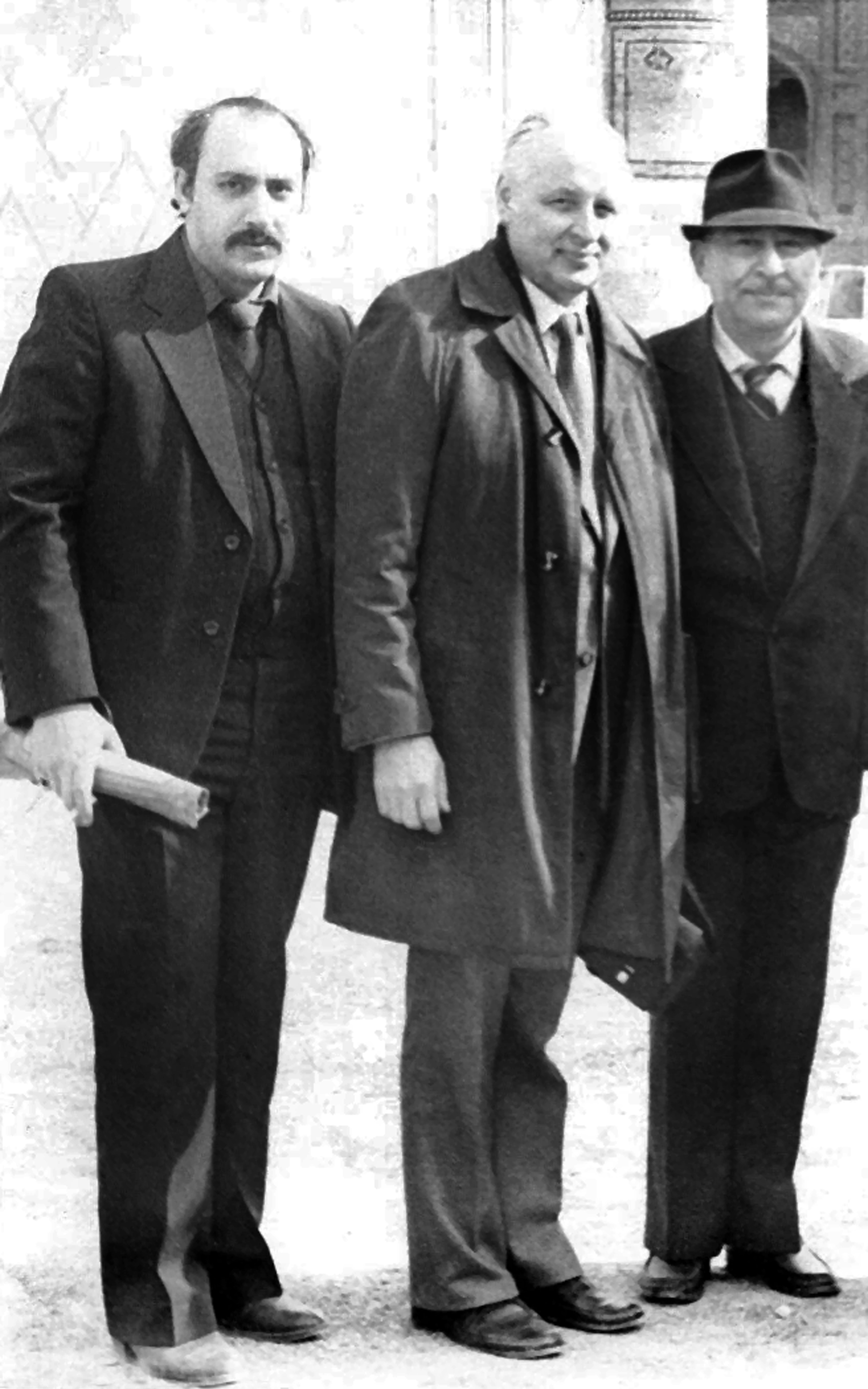
Eldar Mansurov, Jürgen Elsner, Bahram Mansurov in Samarkand in 1983

Jürgen Elsner (born 22 April 1932) is a German music ethnologist and author.

== Life ==
Born in Finsterwalde, Elsner studied music theory, musicology and Arabic philology at the Hochschule für Musik "Hanns Eisler" and the Humboldt-Universität zu Berlin. From 1958 to 1964, he was research assistant at the university's Institute for Musicology. In 1964, he was awarded a doctorate with the dissertation Zum vokalsolistischen Vortrag der Eislerschen Kampfmusik. In 1970, he habilitated with the thesis Der Begriff des maqam in Ägypten. Forschung in der DDR in neuerer Zeit. He then taught music history and music ethnology at the Humboldt University in Berlin and Leipzig University. From 1975 to 1993, he was professor of ethnomusicology at Humboldt University, and from 1979 to 1990 he was head of the musicology department.

== Awards ==
- 1971: Hanns Eisler Prize

== Publications ==
=== As author ===
- with Nathan Notowicz: Hanns Eisler. Quellennachweise. Deutscher Verlag für Musik, Leipzig 1966.
- Zur vokalsolistischen Vortragsweise der Kampfmusik Hanns Eislers. Deutscher Verlag für Musik, Leipzig 1971. (Beiträge zur musikwissenschaftlichen Forschung in der DDR, vol. 1)
- Der Begriff des maqām in Ägypten. Forschung in der DDR in neuerer Zeit. Deutscher Verlag für Musik, Leipzig 1973. (Beiträge zur musikwissenschaftlichen Forschung in der DDR, vol. 5)
- with Paul Collaer: Nordafrika. Deutscher Verlag für Musik, Leipzig 1983.

=== As editor ===
- with Givi Ordžonikidze: Sozialistische Musikkultur. Traditionen, Probleme, Perspektiven. 2 volumes, Verlag Neue Musik, Berlin 1977/83.
- Die Musik der Alten Welt in Ost und West. Aufstieg und Entwicklung. Akademie-Verlag, Berlin 1968.
- Wir reden hier nicht von Napoleon, wir reden von Ihnen! Gespräche mit Hanns Eisler und Gerhart Eisler. Verlag Neue Musik, Berlin 1971.
- with Carola Schramm: Dichtung und Wahrheit – die Legendenbildung um Ernst Busch. 2 volumes, Trafo-Verlag, Berlin 2006, ISBN 978-3-89626-591-3 / ISBN 978-3-89626-592-0
