= Alexander Abusch =

Journalist, writer, politician (1902–1982)

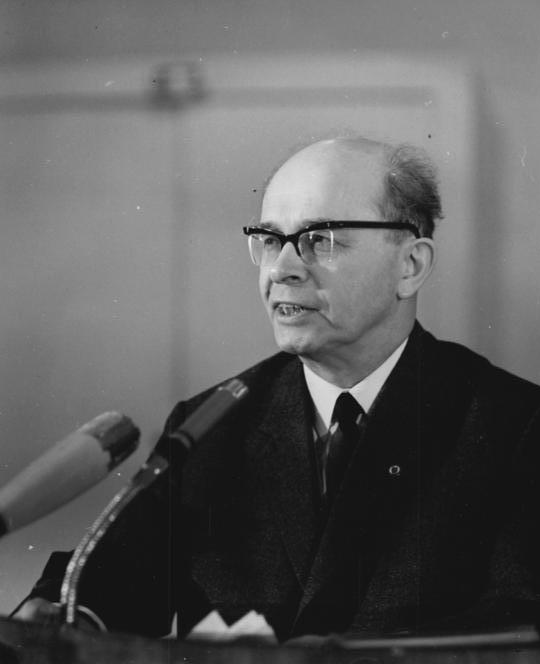
- Alexander Abusch in 1966

Minister of Culture of the German Democratic Republic
- In office December 1958 – January 1961
- Preceded by: Johannes R. Becher
- Succeeded by: Hans Bentzien

Personal details
- Born: 14 February 1902 Kraków, Kingdom of Galicia and Lodomeria, Austria-Hungary or Nuremberg, Kingdom of Bavaria, German Empire
- Died: 27 January 1982 (aged 79) East Berlin, German Democratic Republic
- Party: KPD (1918–1946); SED (1946–1982)
- Profession: Journalist, writer, politician

Alexander Abusch (14 February 1902 – 27 January 1982) was a German journalist, non-fiction writer, and politician.

According to one source he was born into a Jewish family in Kraków, Kingdom of Galicia and Lodomeria, Austria-Hungary. According to another source, he was born in Nuremberg, where, in the suburb of Gostenhof, he grew up, attended school, served his apprenticeship and had his first full-time job. His father worked as a coachman and scrap metal dealer, and later opened a hat shop. His mother also worked as a small trader.

Abusch joined the Communist Party of Germany (KPD) in 1918. He was editor of several KPD publications, including Die Rote Fahne, from which he was dismissed in 1932 for supporting Heinz Neumann in challenging party leader Ernst Thälmann. In 1937, he became part of the exiled KPD leadership in Paris, later in Toulouse. In 1941, he moved to Mexico, where he became a member of the Free Germany Movement. Between 1948 and 1950 he was part of the party leadership of the Socialist Unity Party of Germany. He worked as a Secret Informer for the Stasi. Between 1958 and 1961 he served as Minister of Culture of the German Democratic Republic (East Germany). It was in his role as Minister of Culture that he ordered the demolition of princely castle of Putbus on Rügen.

He published under the pen name Ernst Reinhardt.
