= Gysin =

Gysin may refer to:

- Brion Gysin (1916–1986), English painter, writer, sound poet, and performance artist
- Greta Gysin (born 1983), Swiss politician
- Werner Gysin (1915–1998), Swiss mathematician
  - Gysin homomorphism
  - Gysin sequence

== See also ==
- Gisin (disambiguation)
