= Metropol Verlag =

German publishing house

Metropol
- Genre: Publishing house
- Founded: 1988
- Founder: Friedrich Veitl
- Headquarters: Berlin, Germany
- Products: books
- Website: http://www.metropol-verlag.de/

The Metropol Verlag is a German publishing house, established in 1988 and generally acknowledged as one of the leading publishers on the Nazi era and the history of the GDR.

The company was founded in West Berlin by Friedrich Veitl. Together with S. Fischer, Kiepenheuer & Witsch, Rowohlt, and other publishers, it was a member of the “Article 19 publisher”, who in 1989 printed Salman Rushdie The Satanic Verses in Germany. Metropol publishes mainly books in German. Exhibition catalogs also appear in an English edition.

According to Open Library Metropol publishes about 35 books a year. The most successful works include Eugen Herman-Friede's autobiography Für Freudensprünge keine Zeit (“No time to jump for joy”; 5th edition 2002) and the documentary about the Wannsee Conference by Kurt Pätzold and Erika Schwarz Tagesordnung: Judenmord (“Agenda: Jews Murder”; 4th edition 1998). It also publishes the former East German Zeitschrift für Geschichtswissenschaft (Journal of Historical Science) and the yearly periodical Voyage. Studies on Travel & Tourism.
