= Global Invasive Species Information Network =

The Global Invasive Species Information Network (GISIN) is a web-based network of data providers including government, non-government, non-profit, educational, and other organizations that agree to work together to provide increased access to data and information on invasive species around the world.

Computer-based information systems like those in the GISIN present specific information to help detect, rapidly respond to, and control invasive alien species, flora or fauna.

== Projects ==
As of June 2008, work is proceeding on a draft of a proposed GISIN data-sharing protocol.

== See also ==
- Invasive Species Compendium
- List of the world's 100 worst invasive species
- Island Conservation
