= Gabriele Gysi =

German actress and director

Gabriele Gysi (born 13 July 1946) is a German actress and director.

== Life ==
Gysi was born in Berlin as the daughter of the politicians Irene and Klaus Gysi and is the older sister of Linkspartei politician and lawyer Gregor Gysi. On her father's side, she comes from a Berlin family whose progenitor, the silk dyer Samuel Gysin (1681), in the early 18th century from Läufelfingen (Gabriele Gysi also has Jewish ancestors, including a Jewish great-grandfather on her mother's side and a Jewish grandmother on her father's side. She attended the Staatliche Schauspielschule Berlin and before the Wende (1989/90) at the Volksbühne Berlin, but also at other theaters (e.g. the Theater in Anklam). She directed at the Theater Karl-Marx-Stadt, the Volkstheater Rostock and the Compagnie de Comédie Rostock.

From 1973 to 1981, she also took part in several radio plays on GDR radio as a narrator.

In 1984, she left the GDR. From 2007 to 2008 she was chief dramaturge of the Volksbühne Berlin.

Gysi lives in Berlin-Johannisthal.

== Filmography (as actress) ==
- 1974: Jakob der Lügner
- 1983: Die Schüsse der Arche Noah
- 1983: Langer Abschied (Fernsehfilm)
- 1985: Besuch bei van Gogh
- 1992: Herzsprung
- 2002: Der gemeine Liguster
- 2013: Longs Laden (diploma film by Andreas Scheffer at the HFF)
- 2013: Art Girls

== Theater ==
Director

- 1999: "Wars of the Roses 1-8" (by William Shakespeare): "2. Henry IV, 1 - The Wage Laborers" at the Volksbühne Berlin in the Prater ("New Globe"), Berlin
- 2011: "The Fever" (by Wallace Shawn) at the Euro Theater Central Bonn

Actress

- 1969: Aeschylus: Seven against Thebes - Director: Manfred Karge/Matthias Langhoff (Berliner Ensemble)
- 1971: Heiner Müller: Weiberkomödie (Vera) - Director: Fritz Marquardt (Volksbühne Berlin)
- 1974: Christoph Hein: Schlötel oder Was solls - Director: Manfred Karge/Matthias Langhoff (Volksbühne Berlin)
- 1980: Euripides: Die Frauen von Troja (Kassandra) - Director: Berndt Renne (Volksbühne Berlin - Theater im III. Stock)
- 1981: Carl Sternheim: Die Schule von Uznach (Reformtanzvorkämpferin) - Director: Gertrud-Elisabeth Zillmer (Volksbühne Berlin - Sternfoyer)
- 1984: Paul Gratzik: Die Axt im Haus (Secretary Zachwitz) - Director: Harald Warmbrunn (Volksbühne Berlin - Theater im III. Stock)

== Radio plays ==
- 1973: Alfred Matusche: Van Gogh (Jacky) - Director: Peter Groeger (Biography - Rundfunk der DDR)
- 1974: Augusto Boal: Torquemada - Director: Peter Groeger (Radio play - Rundfunk der DDR)
- 1974: Giorgio Bandini: Der verschollene Krieger (Girl) - Director: Peter Groeger (radio play - Rundfunk der DDR)
- 1980: Alfred Matusche: An beiden Ufern (Bertl) - Director: Peter Groeger (radio play - Rundfunk der DDR)
- 1981: Werner Buhss: Hotte, einfach Hotte (Irina) - Director: Horst Liepach (radio play - GDR radio)
- 1982: Gisela Richter-Rostalski: Markos Geldschein - Director: Norbert Speer (children's radio play - GDR radio)

== Writings ==
- as editor: Der Fall Ulrike Guérot. Attempts at a public execution. Westend Verlag, Frankfurt a. M. 2024, ISBN 978-3-864894503.
- with Gregor Gysi: Unser Vater. A Conversation Aufbau, Berlin 2020, ISBN 978-3-351-03842-7.
