= Karl Ewald Böhm =

German writer and publisher (1913–1977)

- Born: 5 March 1913; Nuremberg, Middle Franconia, Bavaria, German Empire
- Died: 16 May 1977 (aged 64); East Berlin, East Germany
- Occupations: Writer; Censor
- Political party: Communist Party of Germany; Socialist Unity Party of Germany

Karl Ewald Böhm (5 March 1913 – 16 May 1977, Berlin) was an East German writer who also served as Director of the Central Publishing Department in the country's Ministry for Culture. The department was responsible for Censorship.

Böhm also wrote using the pseudonym "Peter Porst".

== Life ==
Born 5 March 1913, in Nuremberg, Böhm's father was a bookbinder. He started school in 1919 in Nuremberg, leaving with his school examinations successfully negotiated in 1932. In 1932 and 1933, he studied Economics and Newspaper journalism at the Nuremberg Academy for Economics and Social Sciences.

He was an active member of the Young Communists from 1930. In January 1933, the NSDAP (Nazi) Party took power and immediately set about creating a one party state. The party in question was the Nazi party and membership of the Communist Party (KPD) accordingly became illegal. From 1933, Böhm nevertheless continued to work for the KPD. He was arrested in October 1933 and in 1934, the Bavarian High Court in Munich sentenced him for "Preparing to commit High Treason" to a two-year prison term. He was imprisoned in Nuremberg in 1934 and 1935 and then transferred to the newly expanded Concentration Camp at Dachau where he remained till 1939. From 1939 until 1942, Böhm was doing clerical work in Nuremberg. Between 1942 and 1945 he served in the army, ending up as a senior squadron leader.

By 1946, the future political map of what remained of Germany was becoming clearer, and in February 1946 Karl Ewald Böhm relocated the 130 km (85 miles) from Nuremberg (in the American occupation zone) to Sonneberg, which was in the Soviet occupation zone (SBZ / Sowjetische Besatzungszone). In Sonneburg he joined the newly created Socialist Unity Party (SED / Sozialistische Einheitspartei Deutschlands). He also co-founded and became the head of a publishing business in Sonneburg, called "Thüringer Verlagsanstalt", and became the editor of a newspaper called "Sozialistische Tribune".

In 1947 and 1948, he attended the ruling party's Karl Marx Academy before serving, between 1948 and 1950, as an editor on the newspaper "Neuer Weg". In 1950 and 1951, he was the newspaper's deputy managing editor. "Neuer Weg" was also the name of a department in the Central Committee of the ruling SED (party), the department being one of which he was in addition deputy head, also serving, from 1951, as deputy head of the Central Committee's Literature Office. Until he was deposed in 1958 he was also Director of the Central Publishing Department in the country's Ministry for Culture. After 1958, he supported himself as a freelance writer. In 1962, he became Chairman of the Frankfurt regional (East) German Writers' Association.

== Awards and honours ==
- 1960 National Prize of East Germany
- 1973 Patriotic Order of Merit (Gold)

== Publications ==
- Atomkraft – Atomkrieg. Berlin 1949, under the Pseudonym Peter Porst, together with G. Klaus
- Gigant Atom. Berlin 1956
- Auf dem Weg zu fernen Welten. Berlin 1958
- together with R. Dörge: Unsere Welt von morgen. Berlin 1960
- Schauplatz Zukunft. Berlin 1974
