= Hans Bentzien =

East German politician (1927–2015)

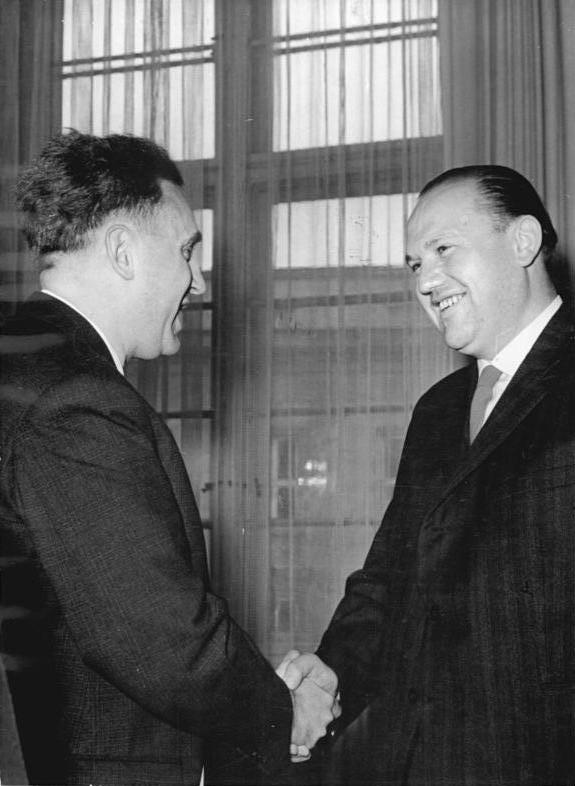
- Hans Bentzien (left) awarding the Johannes R. Becher Prize to the poet and storyteller Franz Fühmann, 1963

Minister of Culture
- In office February 1961 – January 1966
- Chairman of the Council of Ministers: Otto Grotewohl; Willi Stoph
- Preceded by: Alexander Abusch
- Succeeded by: Klaus Gysi

Personal details
- Born: 4 January 1927 Greifswald, German Empire
- Died: 18 May 2015 (aged 88) Bad Saarow, Germany
- Party: Socialist Unity Party of Germany
- Education: University of Greifswald; University of Jena

Hans Bentzien (4 January 1927 – 18 May 2015) was a German writer and politician who served as the culture minister of East Germany from 1961 to 1966. Being a member of the ruling party Socialist Unity Party (SED), he held several political and public posts in East Germany.

== Early life and education ==
Bentzien was born in Greifswald, Germany, on 4 January 1927. He became a member of the Nazi Party in 1944. He joined the German Army and fought in World War II. He was arrested by the British forces in 1945. Following his release he joined the KPD and subsequently the SED in 1946.

Bentzien graduated from the University of Greifswald and the University of Jena obtaining a degree in history. He also studied history and social sciences in Moscow between 1955 and 1958.

== Career ==
Bentzien worked as a teacher in his hometown between 1946 and 1948. He was assistant to the director of culture in VEB Carl Zeiss in Jena. Then he became the first secretary of the SED in Jena-Stadt and was the secretary for culture and popular education of the SED from 1954 to 1955. He served as the secretary for culture and education of the SED in Halle between 1958 and 1961.

Bentzien was appointed culture minister in February 1961, replacing Alexander Abusch in the post. Bentzien was removed from office in January 1966 due to the alleged violation of the SED rules. The reason for his removal was the publication of several writings in Neue Deutsche Literatur (German: New German Literature) which supported views opposite to the position of the SED. In the same move Kurt Turba, head of the youth commission at the Politburo of the SED's Central Committee, was also fired. Klaus Gysi succeeded Bentzien as minister of culture.

Then Bentzien was made the publishing director of a publishing house, Neues Leben, which he held between 1966 and 1975. In 1975 he was appointed deputy chairman of the state committee for television and served in the post until 1979 when he was dismissed. In the period between 1 December 1989 and 13 June 1990 he served as the television manager of East Germany. He was succeeded by Michael Albert in the post.

=== Work ===
Bentzien wrote several television plays and published some books on history.

== Death ==
Bentzien died in Bad Saarow, Germany, on 18 May 2015.
