= Johannes R. Becher =

German politician, novelist and poet (1891–1958)

Johannes Becher
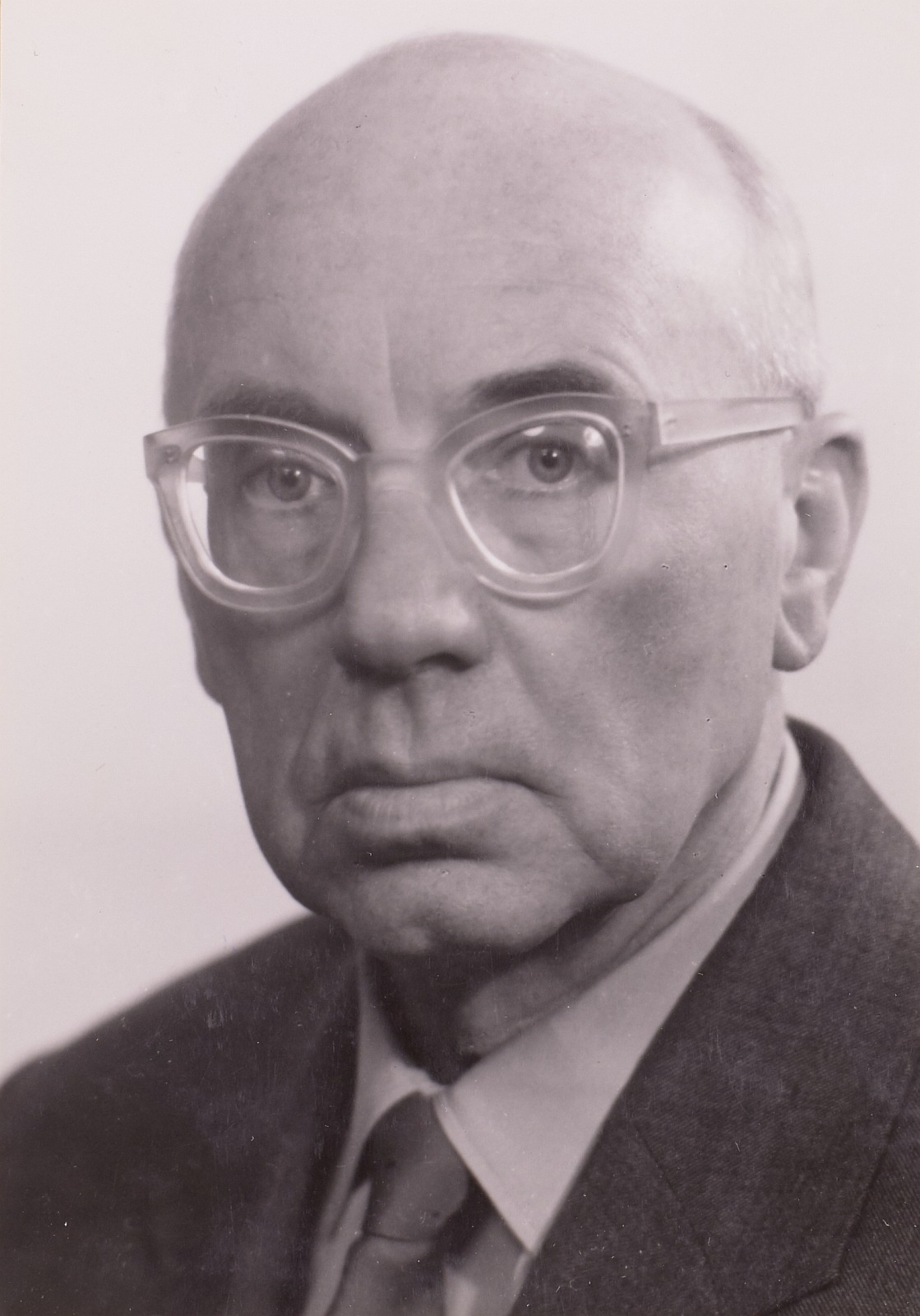
- Becher in 1956

Minister of Culture of the German Democratic Republic
- In office 3 February 1954 – 11 October 1958
- Succeeded by: Alexander Abusch

President of the Cultural Association of the German Democratic Republic
- In office 1945–1958
- Preceded by: office established
- Succeeded by: Max Burghardt

President of the Academy of Arts of the German Democratic Republic
- In office 1953–1956
- Preceded by: Arnold Zweig
- Succeeded by: Otto Nagel

Personal details
- Born: 22 May 1891 Munich, German Empire
- Died: 11 October 1958 (aged 67) East Berlin, East Germany
- Resting place: Dorotheenstadt Cemetery, Berlin
- Party: Socialist Unity Party of Germany (1946–1958); Communist Party of Germany (1919–1920 and 1923–1946); Independent Social Democratic Party of Germany (1917–1918)
- Awards: Stalin Peace Prize (1953)

Johannes Robert Becher (pronounced [joˈhanəs ˌɛʁ ˈbɛçɐ]; 22 May 1891 – 11 October 1958) was a German politician, novelist, and poet. He was affiliated with the Communist Party of Germany (KPD) before World War II. He was part of the literary avant-garde, writing in an expressionist style.

With the rise of the Nazi Party in Germany, modernist artistic movements were suppressed. Becher escaped from a military raid in 1933 and settled in Paris for a couple of years. He migrated to the Soviet Union in 1935 with the central committee of the KPD. After the German invasion of the Soviet Union in June 1941, Becher and other German communists were evacuated to internal exile in Tashkent, Uzbekistan.

He returned to favor in 1942 and was recalled to Moscow. After the end of World War II, Becher left the Soviet Union and returned to Germany, settling in the Soviet-occupied zone that later became East Berlin. As a member of the KPD, he was appointed to various cultural and political positions and became part of the leadership of the Socialist Unity Party. In 1949, he helped found the East German Academy of Arts, Berlin, and served as its president from 1953 to 1956. In 1953 he was awarded the Stalin Peace Prize (later the Lenin Peace Prize). He was the culture minister of the German Democratic Republic (GDR; commonly known as East Germany) from 1954 to 1958.

== Early life ==
Johannes R. Becher was born in Munich in 1891, the son of Judge Heinrich Becher and his wife Johanna, née Bürck. He attended local schools.

In April 1910, Becher and Fanny Fuss, a young woman he had encountered in January of that year, planned a joint suicide; Becher shot them both, killing her and wounding himself severely. His father succeeded in quashing the case of killing on demand. Becher was certified insane. His early poetry was filled with struggling to come to terms with this event.

From 1911 he studied medicine and philosophy in college in Munich and Jena. He left his studies and became an expressionist writer, his first works appearing in 1913. An injury from his suicide attempt made him unfit for military service/ and he became addicted to morphine, which he struggled with for the rest of the decade.

== Political activity in Germany ==
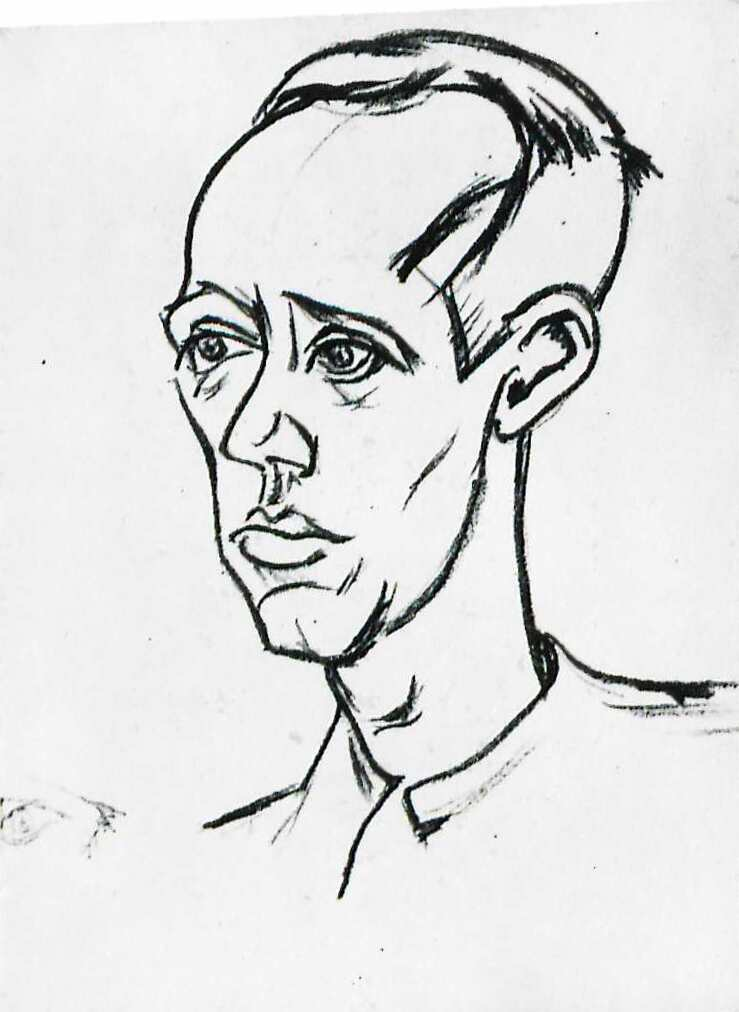
1924 portrait of Becher by Lajos Tihanyi

He was engaged in many communist organisations, joining the Independent Social Democratic Party of Germany in 1917, then went over to the Spartacus League in 1918 from which emerged the Communist Party of Germany (KPD). In 1920 he left the KPD, disappointed with the failure of the German Revolution, and embraced religion. In 1923, he returned to the KPD and very actively worked within the party.

His art entered an expressionist period, from which he would later dissociate himself. He was part of Die Kugel, an artistic group based in Magdeburg. During this time, his work was published in the magazines Verfall und Triumph, Die Aktion (The Action) and Die neue Kunst.

In 1925 government reaction against his anti-war novel, (CHCl=CH)_{3}As (Levisite) oder Der einzig gerechte Krieg, resulted in his being indicted for literarischer Hochverrat (literary high treason). It was not until 1928 that this law was amended.

That year, Becher became a founding member of the KPD-aligned Association of Proletarian-Revolutionary Authors (Bund proletarisch-revolutionärer Schriftsteller), serving as its first chairman and co-editor of its magazine, Die Linkskurve. From 1932 Becher became a publisher of the newspaper, Die Rote Fahne.

== Fleeing from Nazis ==
After the Reichstag fire, Becher was placed on the Nazi blacklist, but he escaped from a large raid in the Berlin artist colony near Breitenbachplatz in Wilmersdorf. By 15 March 1933, he, with the support of the secretary of the Association of Proletarian-Revolutionary Authors, traveled to the home of Willy Harzheim. After staying briefly in Brno, he moved to Prague after some weeks.

He traveled on to Zurich and Paris, where he lived for a time as part of the large émigré community. There his portrait was done by the Hungarian artist, Lajos Tihanyi, whom he befriended.

Finally, in 1935 Becher emigrated to the Soviet Union as did other members of the central committee of the KPD. In Moscow he became editor-in-chief of the German émigré magazine, Internationale Literatur-Deutsche Blätter. He was selected as a member of the Central Committee of the KPD. Soon Becher was caught up in the midst of the Great Purge. In 1935 he was accused of links with Leon Trotsky. Becher tried to save himself by “informing” on other writers' alleged political misdemeanors. From 1936, he was forbidden to leave the USSR. During this period, he struggled with depression and tried several times to commit suicide.

The Molotov–Ribbentrop Pact of 1939 horrified German communists. Following the German invasion of the Soviet Union in June 1941, the government evacuated the German communists to internal exile. Becher was evacuated to Tashkent, as were most of the communist émigrés. It became the center of evacuation for hundreds of thousands of Russians and Ukrainians from the war zones, and the government relocated industry here to preserve some capacity from the Germans.

During his time in Tashkent, he befriended György Lukács, the Hungarian philosopher and literary critic, who was also evacuated there. They intensively studied 18th- and 19th-century literature together, after which Becher turned from modernism to Socialist realism.

Becher was recalled to Moscow by 1942. In 1943, he became one of the founders of the National Committee for a Free Germany.

== Return to East Germany ==
After the Second World War, Becher returned to Germany with a KPD team, where he settled in the Soviet zone of occupation. There he was appointed to various cultural-political positions. He took part in the establishment of the Cultural Association, to "revive German culture", and founded the Aufbau Verlag publishing house and the literature magazine, Sinn und Form. He also contributed to the satirical magazine, Ulenspiegel.

In 1946, Becher was selected for the Party Executive Committee and the Central Committee of the Socialist Unity Party. After the establishment of the German Democratic Republic (GDR) on 7 October 1949, he became a member of the Volkskammer. He wrote the lyrics to Hanns Eisler's melody "Auferstanden aus Ruinen" which became the national anthem of the GDR.

That year, he helped establish the DDR Academy of Arts, Berlin. He served as its president from 1953 to 1956, succeeding Arnold Zweig. In January 1953 he received the Stalin Peace Prize (later renamed the Lenin Peace Prize) in Moscow.

In Leipzig in 1955, the German Institute for Literature was founded and originally named in Becher's honor. The institute's purpose was to train socialist writers. Institute graduates include Erich Loest, Volker Braun, Sarah Kirsch and Rainer Kirsch.

From 1954 to 1958, Becher served as Minister of Culture of the GDR. During the Khrushchev thaw, Becher fell out of favor. Internal struggles of the party eventually led to his political demotion in 1956.

Late in his life, Becher began to renounce socialism. His book Das poetische Prinzip (The Poetic Principle) wherein he calls socialism the fundamental error of his life ["Grundirrtum meines Lebens"] was only published in 1988.

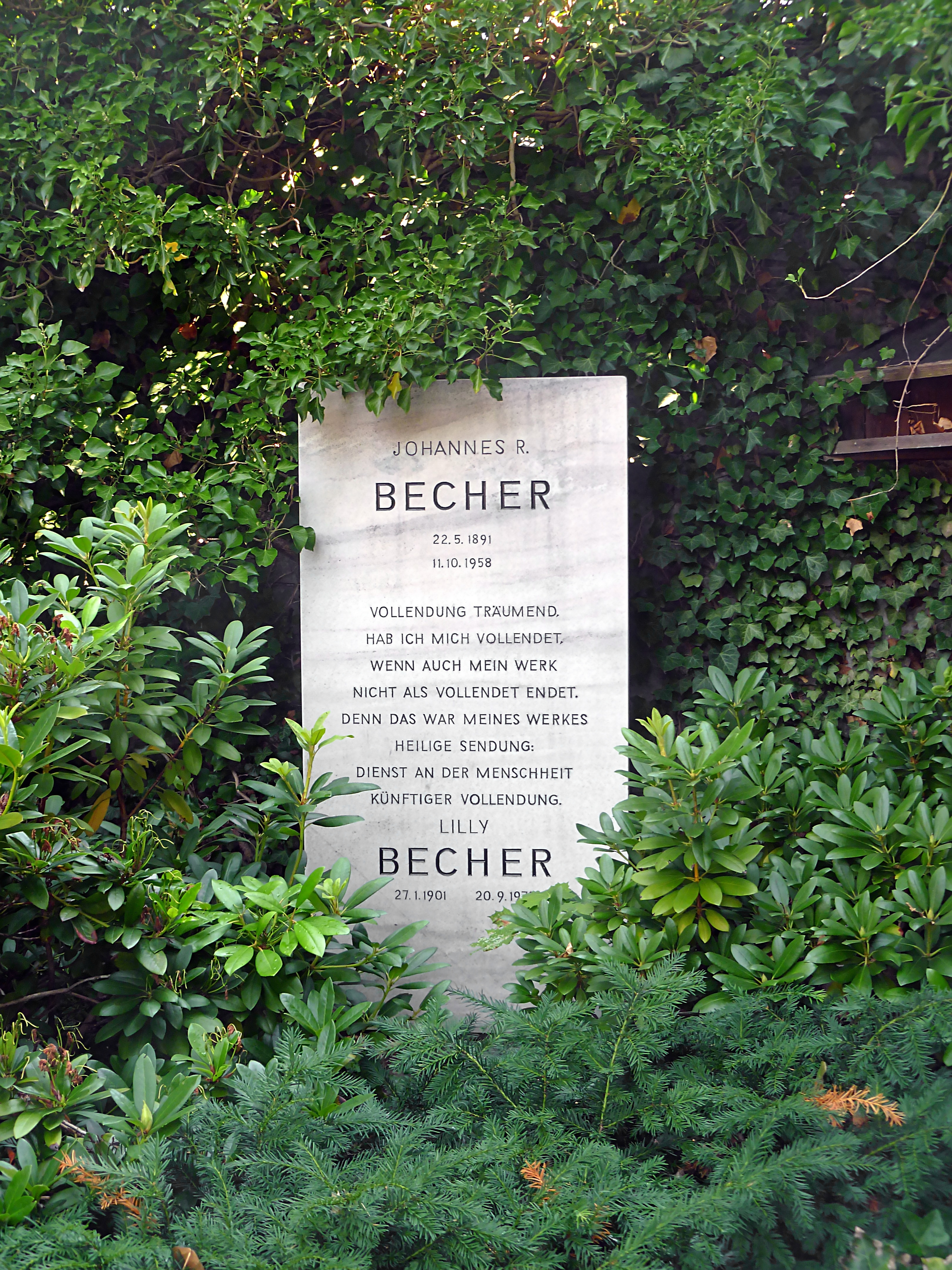
Becher's grave in Berlin

The following year, in declining health, Becher gave up all his offices and functions in September 1958. He died of cancer on 11 October 1958 in the East Berlin government hospital. Becher was buried at the Dorotheenstadt Cemetery in central Berlin, with his gravesite designated as a grave of honor (German: Ehrengrab) of Berlin. Becher lived at Majakowskiring 34, Pankow, East Berlin.

== Legacy and honours ==
The party praised Becher after his death as the "greatest German poet in recent history". However, his work was criticised by younger East German authors, such as Katja Lange-Müller, as backward.

Official awards and honours include the following:

- 1953 Stalin Peace Prize (later renamed the Lenin Peace Prize)
- The Institut für Literatur Johannes R. Becher was founded in 1955 in Leipzig and named in his honor.

== Works ==
- Der Ringende. Kleist-Hymne. (1911)
- Erde, novel (1912)
- De profundis domine (1913)
- Der Idiot (1913)
- Verfall und Triumph (1914)
  - Erster Teil, Poetry
  - Zweiter Teil. Versuche in Prosa.
- Verbrüderung, Poetry (1916)
- An Europa, Poetry (1916)
- Päan gegen die Zeit, Poetry (1918)
- Die heilige Schar, Poetry (1918)
- Das neue Gedicht. Auswahl (1912–1918), Poetry (1918)
- Gedichte um Lotte (1919)
- Gedichte für ein Volk (1919)
- An alle!, Poetry (1919)
- Zion, Poetry (1920)
- Ewig im Aufruhr (1920)
- Mensch, steh auf! (1920)
- Um Gott (1921)
- Der Gestorbene (1921)
- Arbeiter, Bauern, Soldaten. Entwurf zu einem revolutionären Kampfdrama. (1921)
- Verklärung (1922)
- Vernichtung (1923)
- Drei Hymnen (1923)
- Vorwärts, du rote Front! Prosastücke. (1924)
- Hymnen (1924)
- Am Grabe Lenins (1924)
- Roter Marsch. Der Leichnam auf dem Thron/Der Bombenflieger (1925)
- Maschinenrhythmen, Poetry (1926)
- Der Bankier reitet über das Schlachtfeld, Narrative (1926)
- (CHCl=CH)_{3}As (Levisite) oder Der einzig gerechte Krieg, Novel (1926)
- Die hungrige Stadt, Poetry (1927)
- Im Schatten der Berge, Poetry (1928)
- Ein Mensch unserer Zeit: Gesammelte Gedichte, Poetry (1929)
- Graue Kolonnen: 24 neue Gedichte (1930)
- Der große Plan. Epos des sozialistischen Aufbaus. (1931)
- Der Mann, der in der Reihe geht. Neue Gedichte und Balladen., Poetry (1932)
- Der Mann, der in der Reihe geht. Neue Gedichte und Balladen., Poetry (1932)
- Neue Gedichte (1933)
- Mord im Lager Hohenstein. Berichte aus dem Dritten Reich. (1933)
- Es wird Zeit (1933)
- Deutscher Totentanz 1933 (1933)
- An die Wand zu kleben, Poetry (1933)
- Deutschland. Ein Lied vom Köpferollen und von den „nützlichen Gliedern“ (1934)
- Der verwandelte Platz. Erzählungen und Gedichte, Narrative and Poetry (1934)
- Der verwandelte Platz. Erzählungen und Gedichte, Narrative and Poetry (1934)
- Das Dritte Reich, Poetry illustrated by Heinrich Vogeler (1934)
- Der Mann, der alles glaubte, Poetry (1935)
- Der Glücksucher und die sieben Lasten. Ein hohes Lied. (1938)
- Gewißheit des Siegs und Sicht auf große Tage. Gesammelte Sonette 1935–1938. (1939)
- Wiedergeburt, Poetry (1940)
- Die sieben Jahre. Fünfundzwanzig ausgewählte Gedichte aus den Jahren 1933–1940. (1940)
- Abschied. Einer deutschen Tragödie erster Teil, 1900–1914., Novel (1940)
- Deutschland ruft, Poetry (1942)
- Deutsche Sendung. Ein Ruf an die deutsche Nation. (1943)
- Dank an Stalingrad, Poetry (1943)
- Die Hohe Warte Deutschland-Dichtung, Poetry (1944)
- Dichtung. Auswahl aus den Jahren 1939–1943. (1944)
- Das Sonett (1945)
- Romane in Versen (1946)
- Heimkehr. Neue Gedichte., Poetry (1946)
- Erziehung zur Freiheit. Gedanken und Betrachtungen. (1946)
- Deutsches Bekenntnis. 5 Reden zu Deutschlands Erneuerung. (1945)
- Das Führerbild. Ein deutsches Spiel in fünf Teilen. (1946)
- Wiedergeburt. Buch der Sonette. (1947)
- Lob des Schwabenlandes. Schwaben in meinem Gedicht. (1947)
- Volk im Dunkel wandelnd (1948)
- Die Asche brennt auf meiner Brust (1948)
- Neue deutsche Volkslieder (1950)
- Glück der Ferne – leuchtend nah. Neue Gedichte, Poetry (1951)
- Auf andere Art so große Hoffnung. Tagebuch 1950. (1951)
- Verteidigung der Poesie. Vom Neuen in der Literatur. (1952)
- Schöne deutsche Heimat (1952)
- Winterschlacht (Schlacht um Moskau). Eine deutsche Tragödie in 5 Akten mit einem Vorspiel. (1953)
- Der Weg nach Füssen, Play (1953)
- Zum Tode J. W. Stalins (1953)
- Wir, unsere Zeit, das zwanzigste Jahrhundert (1956)
- Das poetische Prinzip (1957)
- Schritt der Jahrhundertmitte. Neue Dichtungen, Poetry (1958)
