= Helmut Baierl =

German writer (1926–2005)

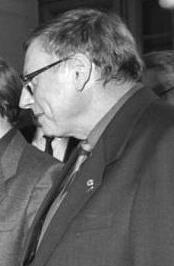
Baierl in 1987

Helmut Johannes Baierl (23 December 1926 Rumburk, Czechoslovakia – 12 September 2005 in Berlin) was a German writer and vice president of the DDR Academy of Arts, Berlin. He was born in Rumburk (Czechoslovakia) and died in Berlin. He was a member of the NSDAP from 1944 to 1945, of the Liberal Democratic Party of Germany (LDPD) from 1945 to 1947, and of the Socialist Unity Party of Germany (SED) from 1947 to 1989.

== Works ==
- Gladiolen, ein Tintenfass und eine bunte Kuh, 1953
- Ein Wegweiser, 1953
- Die Feststellung, 1958
- Frau Flinz, 1961
- Die Feststellung, 1961
- Der rote Veit, 1962
- Fünf Geschichten vom Dreizehnten, 1963
- H. Baierl, M. Wekwerth "Frau Flinz", 1965
- Johanna von Döbeln, 1969
- Der lange Weg zu Lenin, 1970
- Die Köpfe oder das noch kleinere Organon, 1974
- Gereimte Reden (Agitationslyrik), 1976
- Leo und Rosa, 1982
- Das zweite Leben des F. G. W. Platow, 1983
- Die Lachtaube, 1984
- Polly erzählt. Jugenderinnerungen eines Großstadthundes, 1986, ISBN 3-7684-3604-7
