= Cultural Association of the GDR =

Cultural mass organization in East Germany

- Kulturbund der DDR
- Formation: 8 August 1945
- Dissolved: 1990
- Headquarters: East Berlin
- Location: East Germany
- Members: 273,000 (1987)
- Chairman: Johannes Robert Becher (1949–1958); Max Burghardt (1958–1977); Hans Pischner (1977–1990)

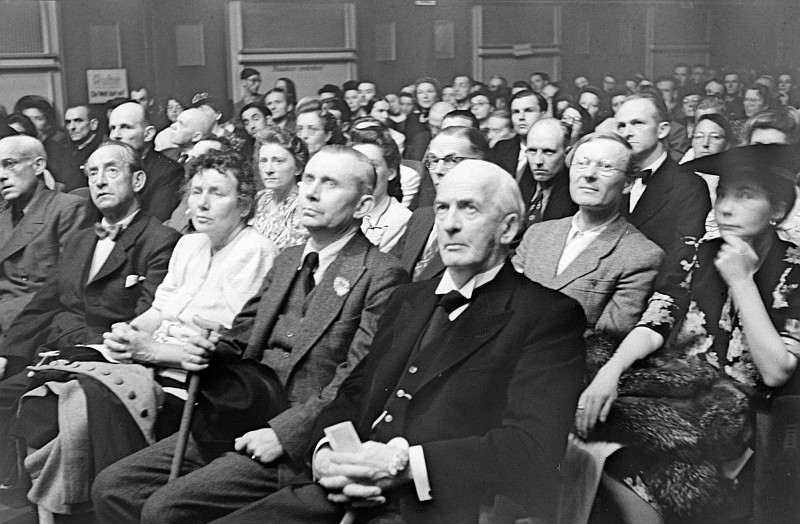
Celebration of the association's first birthday in 1946. Prominent in the front row are the painter Max Pechstein (left) and Berlin's first post-war mayor, Arthur Werner (right).

The Cultural Association of the GDR (German: Kulturbund der DDR, KB) was a federation of local clubs in the German Democratic Republic (GDR). It formed part of the Socialist Unity Party-led National Front, and sent representatives to the Volkskammer. The association had numerous writers among its members, including Willi Bredel, Fritz Erpenbeck, Bernhard Kellermann, Victor Klemperer, Anna Seghers, Bodo Uhse, Arnold Zweig. Its first chairman was Johannes Robert Becher.

Wilfried Maaß was the Secretary of Kulturbund 1984–1990. As of 1987, membership stood at 273,000.

== Chairmen of the Cultural Association of the GDR ==
Name	Entered office	Left office
Johannes Robert Becher	1949	1958
Max Burghardt	1958	1977
Hans Pischner	1977	1990
