= Lied von der blauen Fahne =

East German patriotic song

The Lied von der blauen Fahne (Song of the Blue Flag) was an East German patriotic song written by Johannes R. Becher and set to music by Hanns Eisler. Both Becher and Eisler were also the creators of Auferstanden aus Ruinen, which became the national anthem of the German Democratic Republic (GDR).

== History ==
In 1949, the GDR was founded in the Soviet occupation zone of Germany, which was in place since 1945 after Nazi Germany's defeat in World War II. German communists sought to boost the picture of the GDR as being the first anti-Fascist state on German soil. Unlike West Germany (FRG), the GDR refused to recognize its responsibility for the atrocities committed by the Nazis as it regarded itself as a new socialist national entity that had defeated Nazism.

This official state myth thus enabled the development of a strongly outwardly patriotic ideology East Germany whereas West Germany had a more uncertain public or manifest relationship to its own national identity.

As the GDR still wanted to reunify Germany in its early years, patriotic and propaganda songs constantly mentioned the country as a whole. Especially in the 1950s, patriotic songs praising Germany, German unity and the future of a new, democratic nation were produced and promoted by the GDR government, the socialist party and its sub-organizations.

One of these songs was the Song of the Blue Flag which referred to the flag of the party's youth organisation, the Freie Deutsche Jugend. Its authors, Hanns Eisler and Johannes R. Becher, had also written East Germany's national anthem and other patriotic songs.

The official attitude of the socialist government towards Germany changed in 1974 when the constitution was modified and all passages referring to the country as a whole or the GDR as a "socialist state of the German nation" were effaced. Hence, the lyrics of the national anthem exalting "Germany, our united fatherland" fell out of use, too, as did all songs about a united Germany thad had hitherto been sung.

== Lyrics ==
German original

Auf den Straßen, auf den Bahnen
Seht ihr Deutschlands Jugend zieh'n.
Hoch im Blauen fliegen Fahnen:
Blaue Fahnen nach Berlin!
Links und links, und Schritt gehalten,
Lasst uns in der Reihe geh'n!
Unsre Fahnen sich entfalten,
Um im Sturm voranzuweh'n.

Hebt die Fahnen, lasst sie schweben,
Singt ein neues Fahnenlied!
Wir sind Deutschlands neues Leben,
Und der Frieden mit uns zieht.
Macht des Friedens, du wirst siegen,
Ziehst in alle Herzen ein.
Blaue Fahnen werden fliegen
Hoch im blauen Himmelsschein.

Aus dem Blauen strahlt die Sonne,
Und sie leuchtet, Deutschland, dir.
„Links und links!“ singt die Kolonne,
Freie Deutsche Jugend, wir.
Lasst uns neu die Heimat bauen,
Lasst uns fest zusammensteh'n!
Blaue Fahnen, hoch im Blauen,
Werden über Deutschland weh'n.

English translation

On the streets and on the paths
You see Germany's youth.
High up in the blue sky, flags fly:
Blue flags to Berlin!
Left and left, keep pace,
Let us march in line!
Our flags unfold
In order to fly ahead in tempest.

Hoist the flags, let them flutter,
Chant a new flag song!
We are Germany's new life
And peace accompanies us.
Power of peace, you will be victorious
And move in in every heart.
Blue flags will fly
High in the blue sky.

The sun shines in the blue sky
And it shines for you, Germany.
"Left and left" the column that is us,
The Free German Youth, sings.
Let us build a new country,
Let us firmly stand together!
Blue flags, high up in the blue sky,
Will fly above Germany.

== See also ==
- Auferstanden aus Ruinen
- Children's Hymn
