= Hell on Earth (film) =

1931 film

- Directed by: Victor Trivas; George Shdanoff (uncredited)
- Written by: Leonhard Frank (dialogue); Leonhard Frank (story and adaptation); George Shdanoff (uncredited); Victor Trivas (uncredited)
- Cinematography: Georg Stilianudis; Alexander von Lagorio
- Edited by: Brian King; Walter S. Stern
- Music by: Hanns Eisler
- Release date: 10 December 1931
- Running time: 93 minutes; 66 minutes (1969 restored version)
- Country: Weimar Republic
- Languages: French; English; Yiddish; German

Hell on Earth (German: Niemandsland, lit. ''No Man's Land'') is a 1931 German anti-war film directed by Victor Trivas. In France, The film is also known as La Zone de la mort. The film's sets were designed by the art director Arthur Schwarz.

== Plot summary ==
The film is mainly set in a dugout, formed from a basement, in the no man's land between the trenches and front lines during the First World War.

A ruined house is entered by a soldier stranded between the lines who then discovers an injured man trapped beneath a heavy beam in the basement. The man has no uniform and is rescued by him and another man who we finally realise are on different sides. The injured man cannot speak and is helped out by the other two. They try to leave and return to their own lines but are fired upon by both sides and so return to the safety of the basement.

More soldiers find the safe haven in between all the firing and death, with the credits listing the characters as The Englishman, The Frenchman, The Russian Jew, The Vaudevillian and The German. The storyline follows arguments and discussions between them and ends with them marching out together with a final commentary declaring the sentiment of peace "Marching forward. Defying their common enemy - WAR."

== Cast ==
- Ernst Busch as Ernst Kohler
- Vladimir Sokoloff as Lewin
- Renée Stobrawa as Frau Kohler
- Elisabeth Lennartz as Lewin's Bride
- Hugh Douglas as Charles Brown
- Louis Douglas as Joe Smile
- Zoe Frank as Mrs. Brown
- Georges Péclet as Charles Durand
- Rose-Mai as Frenchman's Sweetheart

== Soundtrack ==
Ernst Busch's version of "Der heimliche Aufmarsch" (The Secret Deployment) by Erich Weinert (poem) and Hanns Eisler (music) is played at the end of the film.
