= Auferstanden aus Ruinen =

National anthem of East Germany (1949–1990)

English: 'Risen from Ruins'
- Emblem of East Germany
- Former national anthem of East Germany
- Lyrics: Johannes R. Becher, 1949
- Music: Hanns Eisler, 1949
- Adopted: 14 November 1949; 1973 (as instrumental)
- Relinquished: 3 October 1990

Audio sample
- (instrumental sample): file; help

Full vocal version

"Auferstanden aus Ruinen" (German: [ˈaʊf(ʔ)ɛʁˌʃtandn̩ ʔaʊs ʁuˈiːnən]; 'Risen from Ruins') was the national anthem of East Germany.

== Background ==
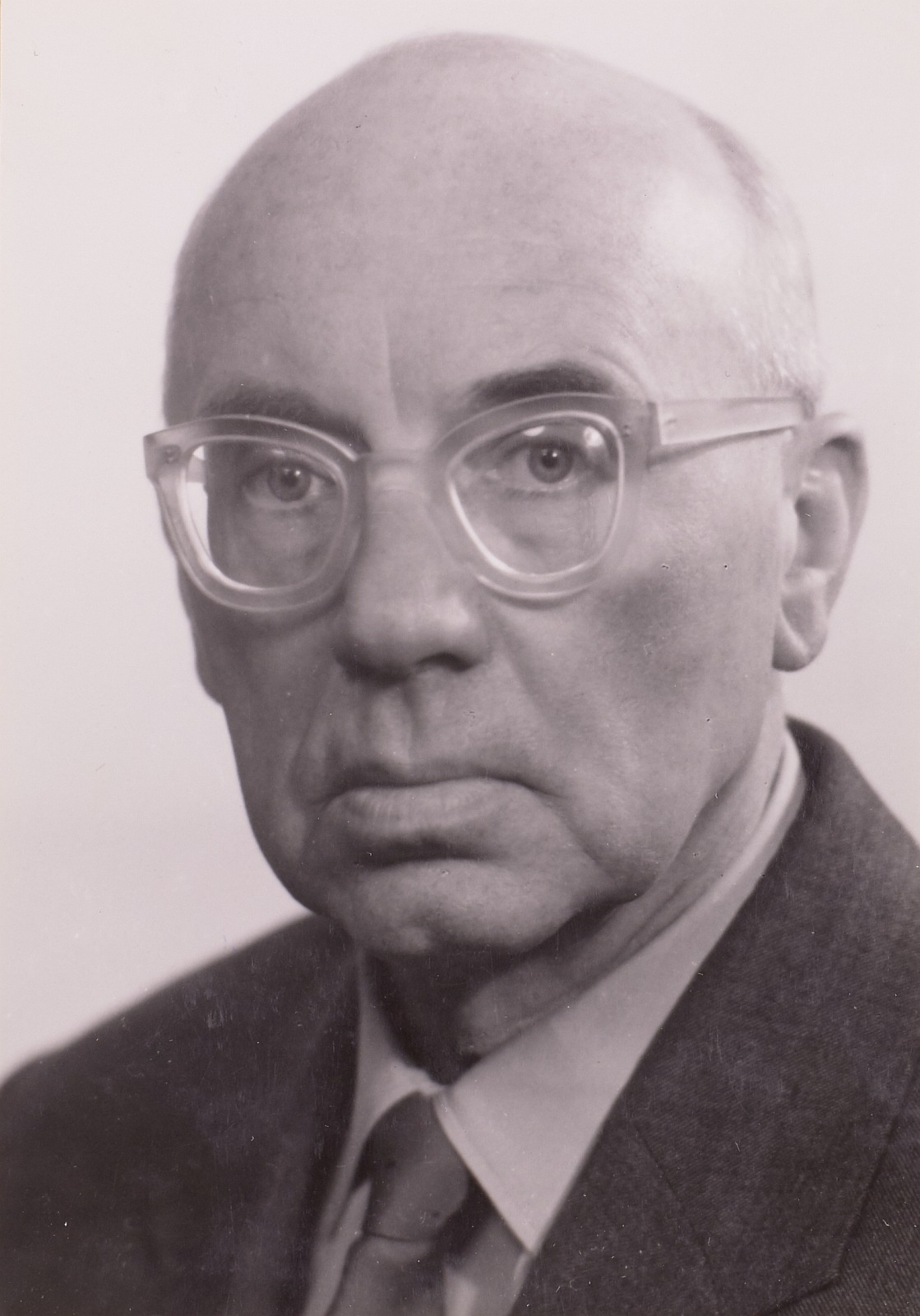
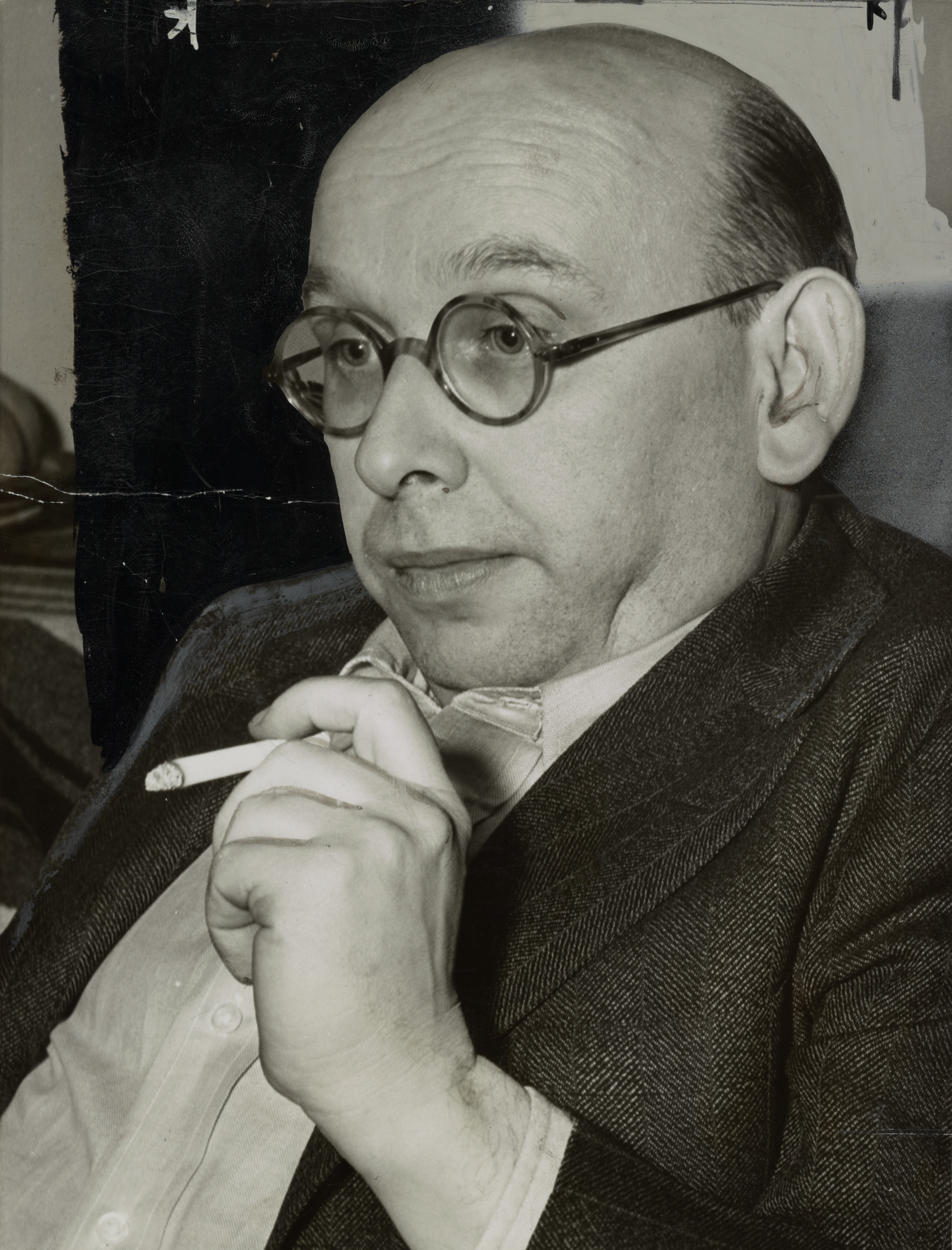
"Auferstanden aus Ruinen" lyricist Johannes R. Becher (left) and composer Hanns Eisler (right)

In 1949, the Soviet occupation zone of Allied-occupied Germany became a socialist state under the name of the "German Democratic Republic" (GDR). For the new state's national anthem, the poet Johannes Becher, who later became the East German Minister of Culture, wrote the lyrics. Two musicians, Ottmar Gerster and Hanns Eisler, proposed music to Becher's lyrics, and Eisler's version was selected.

== History ==
Written in 1949 following the proclamation of the German Democratic Republic, the East German national anthem reflects the early stages of German separation and the nation literally rising from the ruins after World War II, in which continuing progress towards reunification of the occupation zones was seen by most Germans as appropriate and natural. Consequently, Becher's lyrics have several connotations of unity and a unified German fatherland. However, the themes soon would not conform to the Cold War context, especially after Berlin Wall had been erected in 1961 by the East German government.

In September 1973, East and West Germany were admitted to the United Nations simultaneously, following talks between the two governments that conferred a degree of mutual recognition. The term Germany was later removed from the East German constitution, and only the national anthem's tune was played on official occasions. No new lyrics were ever written to replace Becher's, which continued to be used unofficially, especially after the Peaceful Revolution (die Wende) in late 1989.

"Auferstanden aus Ruinen" ceased to be a national anthem when the German Democratic Republic dissolved and its states joined the Federal Republic of Germany as a result of German reunification in 1990. "Deutschlandlied", composed in 1841, became the national anthem of a united Germany again. East German Premier Lothar de Maizière had proposed that Becher's lyrics be added to the united German national anthem, but this was rejected by his West German counterpart, chancellor Helmut Kohl.

In November 1995, "Auferstanden aus Ruinen" was played by mistake when German President Roman Herzog visited Brazil. This was the first event at which the anthem had been played since the German reunification.

In July 2026, Tino Chrupalla, the co-chairman of the German far-right Alternative for Germany and a candidate Ulrich Siegmund sang the anthem together during a campaign event for the 2026 Saxony-Anhalt state election.

== Lyrics ==
German original

I
Auferstanden aus Ruinen
und der Zukunft zugewandt,
lasst uns Dir zum Guten dienen,
Deutschland, einig Vaterland.
Alte Not gilt es zu zwingen,
und wir zwingen sie vereint,
denn es muss uns doch gelingen,
dass die Sonne schön wie nie
𝄆 Über Deutschland scheint. 𝄇

II
Glück und Friede sei beschieden
Deutschland, unserm Vaterland.
Alle Welt sehnt sich nach Frieden,
reicht den Völkern eure Hand.
Wenn wir brüderlich uns einen,
schlagen wir des Volkes Feind!
Lasst das Licht des Friedens scheinen,
dass nie eine Mutter mehr
𝄆 Ihren Sohn beweint. 𝄇

III
Lasst uns pflügen, lasst uns bauen,
lernt und schafft wie nie zuvor,
und der eignen Kraft vertrauend,
steigt ein frei Geschlecht empor.
Deutsche Jugend, bestes Streben,
unsres Volks in dir vereint,
wirst du Deutschlands neues Leben.
Und die Sonne schön wie nie
𝄆 Über Deutschland scheint. 𝄇

IPA transcription (Note: See Help:IPA/German and German phonology.)

I
[ˈˀaʊf.ˀɛɐ.ˌʃtan.dən ˀaʊs ruː.ˈˀiː.nən]
[ˀʊnt deːɐ ˈt͡suː.ˌkʊnft ˈt͡suː.gə.vant |]
[las ˀʊns diːɐ t͡sʊm ˈguː.tən ˈdiː.nən]
[ˈdɔʏt͡ʃ.lant ˈˀaɪ.nɪç ˈfaː.tɐ.ˌlant ‖]
[ˈˀal.tə noːt gɪlt ˀɛs t͡suː ˈt͡svɪŋ.ən |]
[ˀʊnt viːɐ ˈt͡svɪŋ.ən ziː fɐ.ˈˀaɪnt ‖]
[dɛn ˀɛs mʊs ˀʊns dɔx gə.ˈlɪŋ.ən]
[das diː ˈzɔ.nə ʃøːn viː niː |]
𝄆 [ˈˀyː.bɐ ˈdɔʏt͡ʃ.lant ʃaɪnt ‖] 𝄇

II
[glʏk ˀʊnt ˈfriː.də zaɪ bə.ˈʃiː.dən]
[ˈdɔʏt͡ʃ.lant ˈˀʊn.zɐm ˈfaː.tɐ.ˌlant |]
[ˈˀa.lə vɛlt zeːnt zɪç naːx ˈfriː.dən]
[raɪçt deːn ˈfœl.kɐn ˈˀɔʏ.rə hant ‖]
[vɛn viːɐ ˈbryː.dɐ.lɪç ˀʊns ˈˀaɪ.nən |]
[ˈʃlaː.gən viːɐ dɛs ˈfɔl.kəs faɪnt ‖]
[last das lɪçt dɛs ˈfriː.dəns ʃaɪ.nən]
[das niː ˈˀaɪ.nə ˈmʊ.tɐ meːɐ |]
𝄆 [ˈˀiː.rən zoːn bə.ˈvaɪnt ‖] 𝄇

III
[last ˀʊns ˈpflyː.gən last ˀʊns ˈbaʊ.ən]
[lɛɐnt ˀʊnt ʃaft viː niː t͡suː.ˈfoːɐ |]
[ˀʊnt deːɐ ˈˀaɪg.nən kraft fɐ.ˈtraʊ.ənt]
[ʃtaɪkt ˀaɪn fraɪ gə.ˈʃlɛçt ˀɛm.ˈpoːɐ ‖]
[ˈdɔʏ.t͡ʃə ˈjuː.gənt ˈbɛ.stəs ˈʃtreː.bən |]
[ˈˀʊn.zrəs fɔlks ˀɪn diːɐ fɐ.ˈˀaɪnt ‖]
[vɪɐst duː ˈdɔʏt͡ʃ.lants ˈnɔʏ.əs ˈleː.bən]
[ˀʊnt diː ˈzɔ.nə ʃøːn viː niː |]
𝄆 [ˈˀyː.bɐ ˈdɔʏt͡ʃ.lant ʃaɪnt ‖] 𝄇

English version

I
From the ruins risen newly,
To the future turned, we stand.
Let us serve your good weal truly,
Germany, united fatherland.
Triumph over bygone sorrow,
Can in unity be won.
For we shall attain a morrow,
When over our Germany,
𝄆 There's the shining sun! 𝄇

II
May both peace and joy inspire,
Germany, our fatherland.
Peace is all the world's desire,
To the peoples lend your hand.
In fraternity united,
We shall crush the people's foe.
Let all paths by peace be lighted,
That no mother shall again
𝄆 Mourn her son in woe! 𝄇

III
Let us plow and build our nation,
Learn and work as never yet,
That a free new generation,
Faith in its own strength begets!
German youth, for whom the striving
Of our people is at one,
You are Germany's reviving,
And over our Germany,
𝄆 There's the shining sun! 𝄇

Actual translation

I

Risen from ruins,
And facing the future.
Let us serve you for the good, 
Germany, united fatherland.
Old woes are to be overcome,
And we overcome them united.
Because we so must succeed,
[So] that the sun beautiful as never [before].
𝄆 Over Germany shines. 𝄇
II
Happiness and peace be granted,
To Germany, our fatherland.
All the world longs for peace,
Reach your hand out to the peoples.
If brotherly we united ourselves,
We shall defeat the people's enemy.
Let the light of peace shine,
So that a mother never more
𝄆 Mourns her son. 𝄇

III
Let us plough, let us build,
Learn and create like never before,
And, confident in immanent strength, 
A free generation rises up.
German youth, best efforts
Of our people united in you,
You will become Germany's new life.
And the sun beautiful as never,
𝄆 Over Germany shines. 𝄇

Russian version

I
Поднимаясь к новой жизни,
Побеждая зло и тьму,
Будем мы служить отчизне
И народу своему.
Все дороги нам открыты,
Чтоб не знать нужды былой,
Чтоб до самого зенита
Солнце счастья поднялось
𝄆 Над родной Землёй. 𝄇

II
Мир и счастье для народа
Пусть Германия куёт!
Всем народам честно подал
Руку дружбы наш народ.
Если мы едины будем,
Все враги нам не страшны!
Мы стоим за мир, чтоб людям
Не терять своих детей
𝄆 На полях Войны. 𝄇

III
Дружно, немцы, стройте, сейте,
Мирный труд страны любя.
Подрастают наши дети
С крепкой верою в себя.
Молодёжь — краса отчизны
И грядущего оплот!
Солнце новой, яркой жизни
Над Германией родной
𝄆 На века Встаёт. 𝄇

== See also ==
- "Der Heimliche Aufmarsch"
- "The Internationale"
- "Einheitsfrontlied"
- "Kinderhymne"
- "Lied der Partei"
- "Lied von der blauen Fahne"
- "Unsere Heimat"
