= Der Heimliche Aufmarsch =

German communist song

"Der Heimliche Aufmarsch" (lit. 'The Secret Deployment') is a German communist song based on a poem by Erich Weinert written in 1929. The following year, Wladimir Vogel composed music to it, and there is a recording of this original melody with Weinert himself providing the vocals.

In 1931, Ernst Busch sang a version of the song at the end of the 1931 film Hell on Earth. The most famous version is the 1938 remake with a new arrangement by Hanns Eisler, which can be heard at rallies of the Communist Party of Germany (KPD) from that point forward.

In 1957, the song was rewritten to suit the Cold War under the name "Der Offene Aufmarsch" (lit. 'The Open Deployment'), sung by the Central Band of the National People's Army in the German Democratic Republic. The song featured a message criticizing NATO and rallying support for the Warsaw Pact, promising that "there will be peace on the world forever" once they win.

One of the most famous communist songs, "Der Heimliche Aufmarsch" has been sung in several languages including Dutch, Swedish, Norwegian, Russian, Hindi, Punjabi, Pashto, and Korean. The song, notably, includes different themes across versions, with the Swedish one advocating for the creation of the Communist Party, and the Dutch version calling the workers to take up arms on the barricades.

== Lyrics ==
German original

Es geht durch die Welt ein Geflüster
Arbeiter, hörst du es nicht?
Das sind die Stimmen der Kriegsminister
Arbeiter, hörst du sie nicht!?
Es flüstern die Kohle- und Stahlproduzenten
Es flüstert die chemische Kriegsproduktion
Es flüstert von allen Kontinenten
Mobilmachung gegen die Sowjetunion!

Refrain:
Arbeiter, Bauern, nehmt die Gewehre
Nehmt die Gewehre zur Hand
Zerschlagt die faschistischen Räuberheere
Setzt eure Herzen in Brand!
Pflanzt eure roten Banner der Arbeit
Auf jeden Acker, auf jede Fabrik
𝄆 Dann steigt aus den Trümmern der alten Gesellschaft
Die sozialistische Weltrepublik! 𝄇

Arbeiter horch, sie ziehn ins Feld
Und schreien für Nation und Rasse!
Das ist der Krieg der Herrscher der Welt
Gegen die Arbeiterklasse
Denn der Angriff gegen die Sowjetunion
Ist der Stoß ins Herz der Revolution!
Und der Krieg der jetzt durch die Länder geht
Ist der Krieg gegen dich, Prolet!

Refrain

IPA transcription

[ɛs geːt dʊɐç diː vɛlt aɪn gə.ˈflʏ.stɐ |]
[ˈaɐ.baɪ.tɐ hœɐst duː ɛs nɪçt ‖]
[das zɪnt diː ˈʃtɪ.mn̩ deːɐ ˈkʁiːks.mi.ˌnɪ.stɐ |]
[ˈaɐ.baɪ.tɐ hœɐst duː ziː nɪçt ‖]
[ɛs ˈflʏ.stɐn diː ˈkoː.lə ʊnt ˈʃtaːl.pʁoː.duː.ˌt͡sɛn.tn̩ |]
[ɛs ˈflʏ.stɐt diː ˈkeː.mɪ.ʃə ˈkʁiːks.pʁoː.dʊk.ˌt͡si̯oːn ‖]
[ɛs ˈflʏ.stɐt fɔn ˈa.ln̩ kɔn.ti.ˈnɛn.tn̩ |]
[mo.ˈbiːl.ˌma.xʊŋ ˈgeː.gn̩ diː zɔ.ˈvjɛt.u.ˌni̯oːn ‖]

[ʁə.ˈfʁɛ̃ː]
[ˈaɐ.baɪ.tɐ ˈbaʊ.ɐn neːmt diː gə.ˈveː.ʁə |]
[neːmt diː gə.ˈveː.ʁə t͡sʊɐ hant |]
[t͡sɛɐ.ˈʃlaːkt diː fa.ˈʃɪ.stɪ.ʃə ˈʁɔʏ.bɐ.ˌheː.ʁə |]
[zɛt͡st ˈɔʏ.ʁə ˈhɛɐ.t͡sn̩ ɪn bʁant ‖]
[p͡flant͡st ˈɔʏ.ʁə ˈʁoː.tn̩ ˈba.nɐ deːɐ ˈaɐ.baɪt |]
[aʊf ˈjeː.dn̩ ˈa.kɐ aʊf ˈjeː.də fa.ˈbʁiːk ‖]
𝄆 [dan ʃtaɪkt aʊs deːn ˈtʁʏ.mɐn deːɐ ˈal.tn̩ gə.ˈzɛl.ʃaft |]
[diː zoː.t͡si̯aː.ˈlɪ.stɪ.ʃə ˈvɛlt.ʁɛ.pʊ.ˌbliːk ‖] 𝄇

[ˈaɐ.baɪ.tɐ hɔɐç ziː t͡siːn ɪns fɛlt |]
[ʊnt ˈʃʁaɪ.ən fyːɐ na.ˈt͡si̯oːn ʊnt ˈʁa.sə ‖]
[das ɪst deːɐ kʁiːk deːɐ hɛɐ.ˈʃɐ deːɐ vɛlt |]
[ˈgeː.gn̩ diː ˈaɐ.baɪ.tɐ.ˌkla.sə ‖]
[dɛn deːɐ ˈaŋ.gʁɪf ˈgeː.gn̩ diː zɔ.ˈvjɛt.u.ˌni̯oːn |]
[ɪst deːɐ ʃtoːs ɪns hɛɐt͡s deːɐ ʁɛ.voː.lʊ.ˈt͡si̯oːn ‖]
[ʊnt deːɐ kʁiːk deːɐ jɛt͡st dʊɐç diː ˈlɛn.dɐ geːt |]
[ɪst deːɐ kʁiːk ˈgeː.gn̩ dɪç pʁo.ˈleːt ‖]

[ʁə.ˈfʁɛ̃ː]

English translation

There's a whisper going 'round the world –
Worker, don't you hear it?
These are the voices of the war ministers!
Worker, don't you hear 'em?!
Coal and steel producers are whispering,
Chemical warfare production's whispering, too!
The whisper comes from all continents:
"Mobilization against the Soviet Union!"

Chorus:
Workers, peasants, pick up those rifles,
Take those guns into your hands!
Annihilate the fascist bandit armies,
And set every heart ablaze!
Plant your red banners of labour
On every field, on every factory!
𝄆 Then shall arise from the ruins of old society
The Socialist World Republic! 𝄇

Workers, hearken, they are going to war
And they yell: "For nation and race!"
This war is the rulers of the world's
Against the working classes!
Because the assault against the Soviet Union
Is the thrust into the heart of the revolution.
And the war that sweeps through the countries now,
Is the war against you – proletarian!

Chorus

== See also ==
- Hanns Eisler
- Erich Weinert
- Wladimir Vogel
- Ernst Busch
- Hell on Earth (film)
- List of socialist songs
