= Kuhle Wampe =

1932 film

Kuhle Wampe oder: Wem gehört die Welt?
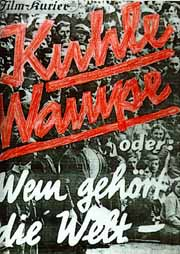
- Directed by: Slatan Dudow
- Written by: Bertolt Brecht; Ernst Ottwalt
- Produced by: George Hoellering
- Starring: See below
- Cinematography: Günther Krampf
- Music by: Hanns Eisler
- Production company: Prometheus Film
- Release date: 14 May 1932
- Running time: US:71 minutes
- Country: Weimar Republic
- Language: German

Kuhle Wampe (full title: Kuhle Wampe, oder: Wem gehört die Welt?, translated in English as Kuhle Wampe or Who Owns the World?, and released in the USA as Whither Germany? by Kinematrade Inc.) is a 1932 German feature film about unemployment, homelessness and left wing politics in the Weimar Republic produced by Prometheus Film. The film was conceived and directed by Slatan Dudow, who brought the idea to Bertolt Brecht, who wrote the screenplay in collaboration with Ernst Ottwalt. Brecht also directed the concluding scene: a political debate between strangers on a train about the world coffee market. The film music was composed by Hanns Eisler.

Kuhle Wampe itself was a tent camp on the Müggelsee in Berlin. Wampe is Berlin dialect for "stomach", so the title could be rendered "Empty Stomach".

The film was banned in Germany in 1932 due to the accusations that it depicted the president, the legal system, and religion in a negative light but, following protests, the ban was lifted for a recut version. The film remained unseen for many years. However, a restored print is now available and a video was released by the British Film Institute in 1999, along with a documentary video essay on the original film by Andrew Hoellering, son of the film's producer George Hoellering.

== Synopsis ==
Kuhle Wampe takes place in early-1930s Berlin. The film begins with a montage of newspaper headlines describing steadily-rising unemployment figures; followed by scenes of a young man looking for work in the city and the family discussing the unpaid back rent. Then the young man, brother of the protagonist Anni, removes his wristwatch and commits suicide by defenestration. Shortly thereafter, they are evicted from their apartment. Now homeless, the family moves into a garden colony of sorts with the name "Kuhle Wampe".

Anni, the family's daughter and the only family member who still has a job, becomes pregnant and then engaged to her boyfriend, Fritz, who complains that their marriage was forced on him because of her pregnancy. Anni leaves Fritz and moves to her friend Gerda's apartment. She later finds herself in a workers' sporting event where she meets Fritz, who has recently lost his job, and they reunite.

The climactic scene (written by Brecht) depicts an impromptu political debate. On their return home by train, Anni, Fritz and other workers argue with middle-class, wealthy passengers about the worldwide financial crisis. One of the workers notes that the well-off will not change the world, to which one of the wealthy asks quizzically, "Who else, then, can change the world?" Gerda replies, "Those who don’t like it."

The film ends with the singing of the Solidarity Song, with lyrics by Brecht and music from Hanns Eisler.

== Cast ==
- Hertha Thiele as Anni
- Ernst Busch as Fritz
- Martha Wolter as Gerda
- Adolf Fischer as Karl Genosse
- Lili Schoenborn-Anspach
- Max Sablotzki
- Alfred Schaefer
- Gerhard Bienert
- Martha Burchardi
- Carl Heinz Charrell
- Helene Weigel as Ballad Singer (voice)
- Karl Kahmen
- Fritz Erpenbeck
- Erwin Geschonneck
- Josef Hanoszek
- Richard Pilgert
- Hugo Werner-Kahle
- Hermann Krehan
- Paul Kretzburg
- Anna Muller-Lincke
- Rudolf Pehls
- Erich Peters
- Olly Rummel
- Willi Schur
- Martha Seemann
- Hans Stern
- Karl Wagner

== Video release ==
- Kuhle Wampe, BFIV053, subtitled, black and white, 68 minutes running time, with a 48-minute documentary
- Kuhle Wampe, or Who Owns the World? DEFA Film Library DVD, restored, subtitled, black & white, 69 minutes running time
- Kuhle Wampe — Censored! reconstruction of the censorship case against the original film, DEFA Film Library DVD, subtitled, black & white, 63 minutes running time
