= Georg Eisler =

Austrian painter (1928–1998)

Georg Eisler (20 April 1928, Vienna – 15 January 1998, Vienna) was an Austrian painter who became widely known as one of the most prominent post-WWII painters. He is well known today for his many portraits of artists and intellectuals. Trained by Oskar Kokoschka in exile in London, Eisler soon developed his own artistic style. His father Hanns Eisler was a composer and his mother Charlotte Eisler, née Demant a well-known singer and music teacher.

His subject matter themes have included landscapes (often industrial featuring the north of England where he had lived after evacuating from Austria in 1936), group or crowd scenes (including jazz clubs and public transport) as well as nudes and still lifes. He returned to Vienna in 1946 where he died in 1998.

Eisler lectured at various universities including the Berlin University of the Arts (Udk), HFBK Hamburg, Stanford University, the University of New Mexico, and the University of Southern California.

== Life ==
Out of political reasons, his mother left Austria in 1936 and lived in with Georg for two years in Moscow. They then went to Prague and in 1939 to England, after the Nazi invasion of Austria. In Manchester, Georg attended Manchester Central High School for Boys and later became a student at the Stockport School of Art and Manchester Academy. He was introduced to Oskar Kokoschka in London, who agreed to give him lessons. In 1946, he returned to Vienna to continue his art studies but never lost touch with England. In 1970, Otto Klemperer commissioned Eisler to design the sets and costumes for Mozart's The Magic Flute at Covent Garden Royal Opera House. In 1968 he was elected President of the Vienna Secession, and served two terms. In this capacity he initiated the successful Secession show at London's Royal Academy. He also had several one-man shows in England. One was the show at the Manchester City Art Gallery in 1988 (which resulted in a BBC program) and at the Fisher Fine Art Gallery in London in 1989. He exhibited his work in numerous venues around Europe, including participation in the 1982 Venice Biennale. He also commenced his career as a major book illustrator. He taught regularly at the Salzburg Summer Academy and several times at the German Summer School run by the University of New Mexico in Taos. A major retrospective of his work was presented at the Belvedere Museum in Vienna in 2001 and another at the Albertina museum in Vienna in 2001. His work is in the permanent collections of the Albertina, the Portrait Gallery of the British Museum in London, the Bibliothèque Nationale in Paris and the Neue Nationalgalerie in Berlin. In 2003, the Leica Company celebrated his lifelong friendship with Henri Cartier-Bresson by presenting a joint show of their work in Vienna. Annually, the Georg Eisler Medal is awarded to the outstanding young artist in Austria. Georg Eisler died in 1998 and is survived by his wife Alice, who resides in Vienna. One can see some of his works dedicated to the Shoah in the TV series Holocaust (1978), in which they are known as "Karl Weiss' drawings".

== Decorations and awards ==
- 1963: Theodor Körner Prize
- Austrian State Prize for Painting
- Honorary Gold Medal of Vienna
- 1971: City of Vienna Prize for Visual Arts
- Klimt Honour of the Vienna Secession
- 1974: Austrian Cross of Honour for Science and Art
- 1993: Austrian Cross of Honour for Science and Art, 1st class
