= Einheitsfrontlied =

1934 German labour movement song

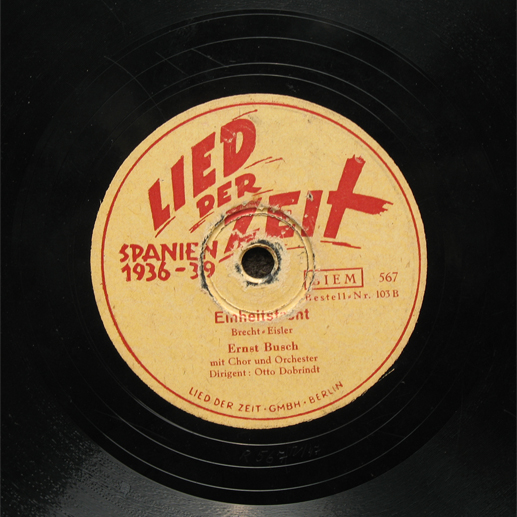
- Recording: Ernst Busch with choir and orchestra, Otto Dobrindt conducting

Song
- Written: Bertolt Brecht
- Published: 1934
- Composer: Hanns Eisler

"United Front Song" (English)
Published by the Lansbury's Labour Weekly, UK

The "Einheitsfrontlied" (German for "United Front Song") is one of the most famous songs of the German labour movement. It was written by Bertolt Brecht and composed by Hanns Eisler. The best known rendition was sung by Ernst Busch.

== History ==
After Adolf Hitler's coming to power in January 1933, the situation for left-wing movements in Germany drastically deteriorated. The antagonism between the Social Democratic Party and the Communist Party had long divided the German left. After the Nazis banned both parties and labour unions in the summer of 1933, many people, including Bertolt Brecht, believed that only a united front of social democrats and communists could fight back against fascism. In December 1934, at the request of fellow theatre director Erwin Piscator, Brecht wrote the "Einheitsfrontlied", calling for all workers to join the Arbeiter-Einheitsfront, the Workers' United Front. The song was performed the next year in the First International Workers Music Olympiad held in Strasbourg by a choir of 3,000 workers. Its first record was printed in 1937, during the Spanish Civil War, performed by communist actor and singer Ernst Busch. It was later published in Brecht's 1939 collection Svendborger Gedichte.

== Composition ==
Hanns Eisler, who would later go on to compose the East German national anthem "Auferstanden aus Ruinen", intentionally kept the composition of "Einheitsfrontlied" simple and easy to follow, so it could be sung by workers without much musical training. In doing so, the song is quite march-like. In 1948, Eisler wrote a symphonic version, which was also sung by Ernst Busch and recorded for his Aurora-Projekt.

== Lyrics ==
German
Und weil der Mensch ein Mensch ist,
drum braucht er was zum Essen, bitte sehr!
Es macht ihn ein Geschwätz nicht satt,
das schafft kein Essen her.
Refrain:
Drum links, zwei, drei!
Drum links, zwei, drei!
Wo dein Platz, Genosse, ist!
Reih dich ein in die Arbeitereinheitsfront,
weil du auch ein Arbeiter bist.

Und weil der Mensch ein Mensch ist,
drum braucht er auch noch Kleider und Schuh!
Es macht ihn ein Geschwätz nicht warm
und auch kein Trommeln dazu.
Refrain

Und weil der Mensch ein Mensch ist,
drum hat er Stiefel im Gesicht nicht gern!
Er will unter sich keinen Sklaven seh'n
und über sich keinen Herr'n.
Refrain

Und weil der Prolet ein Prolet ist,
drum wird ihn kein anderer befrei'n.
Es kann die Befreiung der Arbeiter nur
das Werk der Arbeiter sein.
Refrain

English translation
And because a person is a person,
he'll need something to eat, please!
He gets tired of prattle
for it does not give him food.
Refrain:
So left, two, three!
So left, two, three!
To where your place is, comrade!
Join up with the workers' United Front,
for you are a worker too!

And because a person is a person,
he will need clothes and shoes!
Prattle will not keep him warm,
and neither will the drums [of war].
Refrain

And because a person is a person,
he doesn't need a boot to the face!
He wants no slaves under him,
and no masters above!
Refrain

And because a prole is a prole,
no one else will free him.
The liberation of the working class can only be
the job of workers.
Refrain

Singable
And just because he's a human,
a man would like a little bite to eat;
he wants no bull and a lot of talk
that gives no bread or meat.
Refrain:
So left, two, three!
So left, two, three!
To the work that we must do.
March on in the workers' United Front,
for you are a worker too!

And just because he's a human,
he doesn't like a pistol to his head.
He wants no servants under him,
and no boss over his head.
Refrain

And just because he's a worker,
no class can free him but his own.
The emancipation of the working class
is the task of the worker alone.
Refrain

== Partizaner-Marsh ==
Shmerke Kaczerginski wrote the text for his 1943 Partizaner-Marsh (March of the Partisans) based on the text of "Einheitsfrontlied". His work references the Fareynikte Partizaner Organizatsye (FPO), a Jewish resistance organisation in the Vilna Ghetto in Lithuania.

Yiddish
Der veg iz shver, mir weysn,
Der kamf nit laykht, keyn shpil.
A partizan zayn lebn leygt in shlakht,
Farn groysn frayheyt tsil!
Refrain:
Hey FPO! Mir zaynen do!
Mutik un drayste tsum schlakht.
Partizaner nokh haynt,
Geyen shlogn dem faynt,
Inem kamf far an arbeter-makht.

Es zaynen fest di glider,
Gemusklt in schtol un in blay,
Mir geyen bloyz oyf haynt funem geto aroys
Kedey morgn aykh tsu brengen di fray!
Refrain

Baym blut fun shvester, brider,
Mir shvern tsu kemfn biz van
Mit hitlers yeder glid baputst vet zayn,
Di vofn fun partizan.
Refrain

English translation
The road is difficult, we know,
The combat not easy, no game.
A partisan lays down his life in battle,
For great freedom's sake.
Refrain:
Hey F.P.O.! We are here!
Bold, daring, and ready for battle.
This very day the partisans
Will defeat the fiend,
In the struggle for workers' power.

The limbs are strong.
Muscles of steel and lead,
We are leaving the ghetto today
In order to bring you freedom tomorrow.
Refrain

Upon the blood of our sisters and brothers,
We vow to fight until
Hitler's every limb will adorn
The weapons of the partisans.
Refrain

== Cover versions ==
Ton Steine Scherben covered the song on their 1971 album Warum geht es mir so dreckig?. Hannes Wader recorded the song on his 1977 album Hannes Wader singt Arbeiterlieder.

== See also ==
- "Solidaritätslied"
- List of socialist songs
