= Charlotte Eisler =

Austrian singer, pianist and music teacher

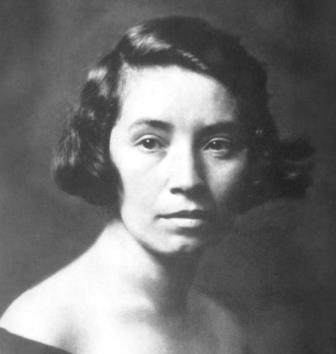
Charlotte Eisler-Demant

Charlotte Eisler (2 August 1894 - 21 August 1970) was an Austrian singer, pianist and music teacher associated with the Second Viennese School.

Born Charlotte Demant in Ternopil (now in Ukraine), her family moved to Chernivtsi where she attended school. Early in the First World War, they moved to Vienna. There Charlotte studied music. Her teachers included Anton Webern and Eduard Steuermann. As a student she met composers Arnold Schönberg and Hanns Eisler. She married Eisler in 1920, they separated in 1934. Artist Georg Eisler was their only child.

Active in left-wing politics, Eisler was obliged to leave Vienna in 1934 for Bratislava. In 1936 she travelled to Moscow. Travelling back to Vienna in 1938, she learned in Prague of the invasion by Nazi Germany and subsequent Anschluss. As a result, she travelled on to England with her son and remained there during the Second World War, finally returning to Vienna in 1946.

From 1947 until 1952 she taught song at the Konservatorium Wien. She died in Vienna in 1970.
