= Deutsche Sinfonie =

Deutsche Sinfonie, Op. 50, is a composition for soloists, chorus and orchestra by Hanns Eisler. Despite the title, it is considered to be more in the style of a cantata than a symphony. Principally composed between 1935 and 1947, but not completed until 1957, it is an eleven-movement setting of poems by Bertolt Brecht, drawn mainly from Brecht's Songs, Poems and Choruses of 1934, and by Ignazio Silone, adapted by Eisler. It was premiered in its full form at the Berlin State Opera, East Berlin, on 24 April 1959. Brecht had died in 1956.

Eisler's theme was the advance of Nazism in Germany. Yet the composer encountered difficulties in both reception and performance of the work throughout its long period of composition and development. When the first two movements (at this stage subtitled An Anti-Hitler Symphony) won a prize at the 15th Festival of the International Society for Contemporary Music, gaining a promised performance of them at the 1937 Paris World Exhibition, the Nazi regime persuaded the French government to have the performance cancelled.

== Movements ==
1. Präludium
2. An die Kämpfer in den Konzentrationslagern [To the fighters in the concentration camps]
3. Etüde für Orchester
4. Erinnerung (Potsdam) [Memory]
5. In Sonnenburg
6. Intermezzo für Orchester
7. Begräbnis des Hetzers im Zinksarg [Burial of the trouble-maker in a zinc coffin]
8. Bauernskantate: A. Mißernte, B. Sicherheit, C. Flüstergespräche, D. Bauernliedchen [Peasant Cantata: A. Crop failure, B. Security, C. Dialogue in whispers, D. Sickle song]
9. Arbeiterkantate [Song of the class enemy]
10. Allegro für Orchester
11. Epilog
