= Ernst Busch (actor) =

German singer and actor (1900–1980)

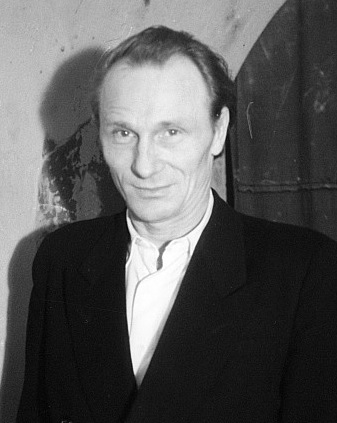
- Busch in 1946
- Born: 22 January 1900; Kiel, German Empire
- Died: 8 June 1980 (aged 80); Bernburg, East Germany
- Occupations: Singer, actor
- Spouse: Eva Zimmermann
- Awards: Lenin Peace Prize

Friedrich Wilhelm Ernst Busch (22 January 1900 – 8 June 1980) was a German singer and actor. He is best known for singing German socialist songs and was active during the Civil War in Spain and World War II.

== Biography ==
Busch was born to a Kiel worker family. He started in life as a shipyard worker before he decided to make use of his acting and singing talent.

Busch first rose to prominence as an interpreter of political songs, particularly those of Kurt Tucholsky, in the Berlin Kabarett scene of the 1920s. He starred in the original 1928 production of Bertolt Brecht's The Threepenny Opera, as well as the subsequent 1931 film by Georg Wilhelm Pabst. He also appeared in the movie Kuhle Wampe, singing Solidaritätslied.

A lifelong communist, Busch fled Nazi Germany in 1933, accompanied by his wife, Eva Busch, and with the Gestapo on his heels, initially settling in the Netherlands. By 1938 they had divorced, without acrimony, as their lives diverged. Eva settled in Paris while Ernst initially made his home in the Soviet Union where he worked with Gustav von Wangenheim on the 1935 film "Kämpfer" ("Fighters"). In 1937 he joined the International Brigades to fight against the nationalists in Spain. His wartime songs were then recorded and broadcast by Radio Barcelona and Radio Madrid. After the Spanish Republic fell to General Franco, Busch migrated to Belgium where he was interned during the German occupation and later imprisoned in Camp Gurs, France and Berlin. Freed by the Red Army in 1945, he settled in East Berlin, where he acted in the first play to be produced in the American-occupied zone, Robert Ardrey's Thunder Rock. He would go on to start his own record label and work with Bertolt Brecht and Erwin Piscator at the "Berliner Ensemble". A beloved figure in the German Democratic Republic, he is best remembered for his performance in the title role of Brecht's Life of Galileo and his recordings of workers songs, including many written by Hanns Eisler. He also lent his voice to a memorable recording of "Peat Bog Soldiers".

== Recordings of Spanish Civil War songs (incomplete list) ==
From "Canciones de las Brigadas Internacionales" and "Solidarität".

- Adelante Campesinos
- Am Rio Jarama – "On the Jarama Front"
- Ballade der XI Brigade on YouTube / Lied von der XI Brigade – "Song of the XIth Brigade"
- Los Campesinos – "The Peasants"
- Las Compañías de Acero
- Los Cuatro Generales
- Himno de Riego / Riego Hymne – "Colonel Riego's Hymn"
- Hans Beimler
- Des Lied von der Einheitsfront' / Einheitsfrontlied
- Lied der Internationalen Brigaden' / Lied Der Interbrigaden – "Song of the International Brigades"
- Mamita Mia
- Die Moorsoldaten – "Peat Bog Soldiers"
- Nuestra Bandera – "Our Flag"
- Peter, Mein Kamerad – "Peter, My Comrade"
- "Spaniens Himmel" or "Die Thälmann-Kolonne" – "Spain's Heaven" or "The Thälmann Battalion" (Page 30f)

== Recordings of Second World War and other songs (incomplete list) ==
- Ach Ihr Wege
- Alle Waffen gegen Hitler
- Ami go home
- Aufbaulied
- Die Armeen Europas
- Ballade von den Säckeschmeißern
- Der Barrikaden-Tauber
- Dank Euch Ihr Sowjetsoldaten
- Das Lied vom SA-Mann
- Diplomaten
- Der Graben
- Der heimliche Aufmarsch
- Es Kommt der Tag
- Einheitsfrontlied
- Frieden der Welt
- Kämpfen wie Lenin
- Kampflied gegen den Faschismus
- Korea
- Lenin
- Lied der Bergarbeiter
- Lied der Interbrigaden
- Lied der Partei
- Lied der Werktätigen
- Lied vom Adler Stalin
- Lied vom Vaterland
- Linker Marsch
- Links Rechts
- Lob des Kommunismus
- Marsch der Antifaschisten
- Der Marsch Ins Dritte Reich
- Matrosen von Kronstadt
- Der rote Wedding
- Sehnsucht nach der Heimat
- Solidaritätslied
- Stalin Freund Genosse
- Trotz alledem
- Legende vom toten Soldaten
- Vorwärts Bolschewik
- Wir sind des Geyers schwarzer Haufen

== Awards, medals, and recognition ==
Germany's most prestigious school for stage acting and directing is named after the actor, the Ernst Busch Academy of Dramatic Arts (Hochschule für Schauspielkunst "Ernst Busch", HFS) in Berlin. Busch was awarded the Lenin Peace Prize for 1970–71.

== Filmography ==
Year	Title	Role	Notes
1929	Katharina Knie		
1931	The Street Song	Der Straßensänger	
1931	Gassenhauer	Peter	
1931	The Song of Life	Sänger	
1931	Kameradschaft	Wittkopp	
1931	Die Koffer des Herrn O.F.		
1931	Hell on Earth	Ernst Kohler	
1932	Kuhle Wampe	Fritz	
1932	Raid in St. Pauli	Singer	
1932	Strafsache van Geldern		
1932	Die Zwei vom Südexpress	Hans, Heizer	
1932	Eine von uns	Peter	
1933	The Lake Calls	Besatzung der 'Carola'	
1936	Der Kampf	Judge	
1960	Five Cartridges	Singer	
1961	Mutter Courage und ihre Kinder	Koch	
1971	Goya or the Hard Way to Enlightenment	Gaspar Melchor de Jovelianos	(final film role)

== See also ==
- Pete Seeger (section 'Spanish Civil War songs')
- International Brigades order of battle (section 'XI International Brigade' point 'Songs')
- VEB Deutsche Schallplatten the state-run record label started by Busch in 1946
