= Solidaritätslied =

German revolutionary song (1929-1931)

- Eisler and Brecht, 1950

Song
- Language: German
- English title: Solidarity Song
- Written: 1929–1931
- Genre: Industrial folk music
- Composer: Hanns Eisler
- Lyricist: Bertolt Brecht

The "Solidaritätslied" ("Solidarity Song") is a revolutionary working song written between 1929 and 1931 by Bertolt Brecht, and set to music by Hanns Eisler. It was written against the background of World War I, the Great Depression, and the social issues caused by the Industrial Revolution that were explored in Brecht's 1932 film Kuhle Wampe in which the song also appeared.

== History ==
Two versions of the text exist, both written by Brecht. The better known version is the second, written during the Spanish Civil War, which is more abstract and ideological. The first version is more closely tied to the film Kuhle Wampe where the melody is used frequently. Similarly, it features in the 1932 orchestral Suite No. 3 Kuhle Wampe, Op. 26. In 1932, the song was first performed with the collaboration of several working-men's choirs. The song spread quickly in the final months of the Weimar Republic, particularly at sporting events.

== Structure and score ==
The text used in the film differs in parts from the second version. E.g. the following verse is only in the film:

Kommt heraus aus eurem Loche,
das man eine Wohnung nennt.
Und nach einer grauen Woche
folgt ein rotes Wochenend!

Come out of your hole
that one calls accommodation,
and after a grey week
follows a red weekend.

In Eisler's setting, in D minor, the first four syllables of the word "Solidarity" are repeated on the same pitch (a "D" above a subdominant G minor chord), while the final syllable of the chorus is sung one semitone (half step) lower, a C♯ over a dominant A major chord. The final four bars of the song's coda repeat this chord change, ending on the dominant instead of the more natural return to the tonic, leaving the end of the song open, both musically and textually:

Wessen Morgen ist der Morgen,
wessen Welt ist die Welt?

Whose tomorrow is tomorrow,
whose world is the world?

The melody uses the BACH motif; the four notes are heard on the first beats in the bars 1, 2, 5, and 6. Eisler composed in 1934 a Prelude and Fugue on B–A–C–H for string trio, Op. 46.

== Versions ==
The text has been translated into multiple languages. The best known version was performed by Ernst Busch, who also appeared in Kuhle Wampe.

In 1961, a group of noted East German composers produced the joint composition Orchestervariationen über Eislers Solidaritätslied ("Orchestral variations of Eisler's Solidarity Song"). Among these were Andre Asriel, Fritz Geißler, Herbert Kirmße, Günter Kochan, Siegfried Köhler, Dieter Nowka, Joachim Werzlau and Ruth Zechlin, some of whom were students of Eisler.

Frederic Rzewski's 1975 piano composition The People United Will Never Be Defeated! cites the "Solidaritätslied" at variation 26.

The final two bars were used as an interval signal by the East German broadcaster Stimme der DDR.

== See also ==
- Einheitsfrontlied
- List of socialist songs
