= Eva Busch =

German-born singer and cabaret artist

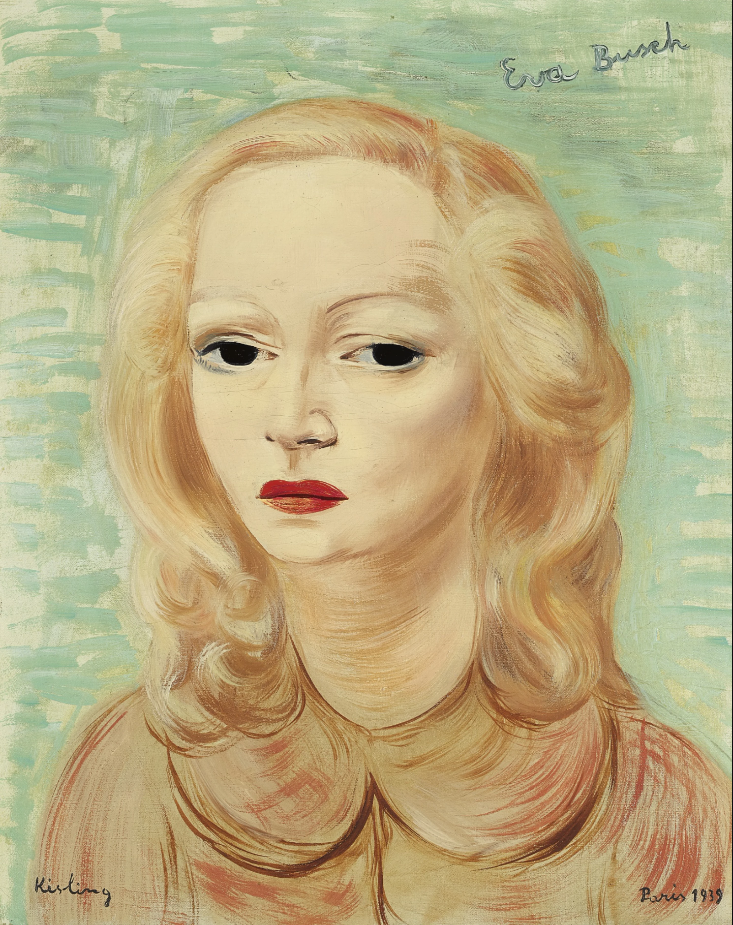

Eva Busch (born Eva Zimmermann: 22 May 1912 – 20 July 2001) was a German-born singer and cabaret artist.

== Life ==
=== Family provenance and early years ===
Eva Senta Elisabeth Zimmermann was born in Berlin: on the same day of the year as Richard Wagner. She was the daughter of the opera singer Emmy Zimmermann whose admirers had included Claude Debussy.

A year before the publication of her autobiography in 1991 she disclosed the identity of her father in an interview. Franz Beidler was a Swiss orchestral conductor and, perhaps even more significantly, a son in law to Richard Wagner whose musical reputation was by the time of Eva's birth sky high. He was another of Emmy Zimmermann's admirers. In 1908, while his wife, Isolde was suffering from a bout of tuberculosis, Franz Beidler and Emmy Zimmermann fell in love. Eva's birth was the result. Later Eva's mother, Emmy Zimmermann married: as a result Eva's name changed and she was known until her own marriage as Eva Klein.

=== Musical training ===
Eva Klein received her first piano lesson when she was 4 and her first violin lesson when she was 7. Dancing lessons began when she was 5. Musical training sometimes came at the expense of other conventional aspects of her schooling, and when her evening engagements began to interfere with her school work she gave up on her Lyceum (secondary school). She nevertheless received a rigorous conventional musical training, attending the Berlin Music Conservatory where she received lessons in piano and violin playing. Her first singing teacher was her mother. She also took lessons at the Reinhardt academy. Her first professional engagements were as a singer and actress at Berlin's recently opened Volksbühne (theatre). She frequently appeared both at the Volksbühne and in cabaret productions with Ernst Busch, a stage performer like herself and, additionally, a committed communist. The two of them married in 1932. One benefit of the marriage for Eva was that it gave her a nationality: because of her illegitimacy she had, up till this point, been legally "stateless". Like her husband she was openly opposed to the Nazi party which was gaining public support in response to populist-nationalist currents of the time and the economically challenging backwash from the Great Depression. Ernst and Eva Busch enjoyed success in their stage performances with songs by Bertolt Brecht, Walter Mehring and Kurt Tucholsky (and others). There is little, if any, documentation of her political views in English.

=== Exile from Nazi Germany ===
The Nazis took power in January 1933 and lost no time in transforming Germany into a one-party dictatorship. Ernst Busch, who had a reputation from his cabaret appearances as a singer of political songs, received a tip-off that he was about to be arrested and on 9 March 1933, anticipating and avoiding the arresting officers by a few hours, he escaped to the Netherlands. He was accompanied or quickly followed by Eva. In the Netherlands she was engaged to perform as a singer on the national broadcasting network and began to put together her own programmes. Together with Ernst she also used her radio slots to criticise the Nazi government in Germany. According to one source this was the reason that Ernst and Eva were both deprived of their German citizenship "in absentia" in 1937. She also made a point of singing songs from The Threepenny Opera and other songs with words by German lyricists whose work had been banned from Germany's own broadcast media for reasons of race and/or politics.

For Eva Busch statelessness was not an unfamiliar condition, but this time she was fairly quickly able to obtain identity documents from the Dutch authorities which enabled her to travel internationally. That was important for her work. In 1936 she travelled to the United States of America where she performed for various radio stations, but she missed Europe and returned to the Netherlands. Her travels also took her to Belgium and Switzerland. It was in Zürich that she was for a time a member of Erika Mann's exiled cabaret troupe, "Die Pfeffermühle" ("The pepper grinder"). Increasingly, however, it was to France that she was drawn. Meanwhile, Ernst Busch was drawn by his own professional and political connections to the Soviet Union where he worked with Gustav von Wangenheim on the 1935 film "Kämpfer" ("Fighters"). Shortly after that he became a fighter himself, moving to Spain where sources relate that he serves in the Civil War with the anti-fascist International Brigades as a singer. In or before 1938 Eva and Ernst Busch were divorced. Eva explained, "the divorce did not reflect any shortage of love, but our marriage was simply impossible" ("Die Scheidung war kein Mangel an Liebe, sondern unsere Ehe war einfach unmöglich.")

By around 1937 Eva Busch was living and working as a singer and cabaret artist in Paris. She featured on the cabaret stage with Suzy Solidor. She met Picasso, Cocteau and Giraudoux. She appeared for the first time in the cabaret of Agnès Capri in January 1939. She also featured as a singer on the radio stations and began to make recordings. In May/June 1940 the German invasion of northern France took her by surprise. During the first part of the decade Paris had been a welcoming refuge for political refugees from Nazi Germany, but as international tensions increased French immigration policy had become less welcoming. By 1940 all the German born residents were obliged to register their address with their local town hall, and report to the local authorities once per week. That meant that once the Germans invaded and the government worked out what to do, the authorities had up to date information on the whereabouts of the many German exiles in Paris. Like all the registered German born citizens of Paris she was identified as an enemy alien and invited to report to the Winter Velodrome. Here they were detained, held for a few days in Paris, and then transported to the Gurs internment camp in the far southwest of the country where Busch remained between May and July 1940.

The Gurs internment camp had been created a couple of years earlier to accommodate fighters returning from the Spanish Civil War. By around 1942 it was conventionally secure, but during 1940 "security" was for most purposes dependent on the fact that it was a long way up a small mountain valley and a very long way off the beaten track. Sources record that she escaped from Gurs, which she probably did by walking out through the front gate and not returning from the village in the evening. Making her way back across France, as she did, would have been a greater challenge. On returning to Paris she was able to work incognito, singing for the radio stations set up in France to entertain the German troops controlling northern France.

=== Recapture and repatriation ===
In 1942 the Gestapo caught up with her in Paris where she was condemned for having imperiled "the security of the people and the state" and for "damaging the reputation of Germans in the eyes of foreigners." The condemnation was accompanied by an eight-year prison sentence. She was taken from Paris to Berlin where she was held in the Alexanderplatz prison. After seven months her sentence was converted into indefinite detention in a concentration camp. She was transferred to the women's concentration camp at Ravensbrück in the marshy countryside to the north of Berlin. She was accommodated with other "political prisoners". Most had been imprisoned because they were Jewish or Communists (or both). Eva Busch was neither of these, but she had emigrated to get away from Nazi Germany which was enough for the authorities. Conditions were grim. Work was undertaken in "labour columns": it included loading barges, carrying rocks and creating timber structures. When she was caught helping French inmates she was placed in a dark windowless cell for seven weeks. In the words of one source, hatred for the Nazis gave her the strength to survive: she was determined to live long enough to see their downfall.

After the war was over she told an interviewer that even while she was kept in the concentration camp, she was much loved by German audiences: "Because of Goebels' stupidity I was known here [in Germany]. Although my records were banned, he sent them to all the [soldiers at the] front".

Eva's mother, Emmy Zimmermann, bombarded the authorities with appeals for Eva to be released. During 1944 the mother fell seriously ill which evidently increased her determination, or at least the effectiveness of her campaign on behalf of her daughter. It was not generally known at this time that Eva Busch had been conceived as a result of her mother sharing Eva Busch's father with the father's wife, Isolde, who also happened to be Richard Wagner's daughter. But Emmy Zimmermann's career as a top Wagner soprano during the earlier decades of the twentieth century and her continuing "connections" to the powerful Wagner dynasty were no secret. It was also no secret that top Nazis, including Hitler himself, were enthusiastic backers of the Wagner cult. Sources differ over whether it was her mother's efforts on her behalf that shifted government opinion, or whether she benefitted from a growing awareness that one of the singers whose records were most popular with the troops fighting the war was being held in a concentration camp. Either way, whereas most Ravensbrück survivors emerged only as the war ended, Eva Busch, camp inmate number 7964, was released some months earlier. She made her way back to Berlin, arriving in time to experience, from inside the city limits, the city's destruction . Escaping the city quickly became impossible and was in any case officially forbidden. At the "Haus Vaterland" pleasure palace in the Potsdammer Platz she sang to entertain war-wounded soldiers with songs she had earlier sung in Paris such as Manfred Krug's "Du hast Glück bei den Frau'n, Belami" ("You're lucky with the women, handsome friend"). Weeks later she was singing for Russian troops and then for the Americans.

During the final ten days of April 1945 the Soviet army entered Berlin. Ernst Busch was released from the Brandenburg penitentiary on 27 April 1945 into a city where suddenly the artillery bombardments had fallen silent. He had spent most of the war years in state detention after being arrest in Antwerp on or shortly after 10 May 1940 as the German army invaded Belgium. Eva Busch and her former husband were briefly reunited in the sea of rubble that had been Berlin. Together they made an appearance on the RIAS (radio service) that the Americans had set up. Before she left the city Eva Busch made a couple more radio broadcasts which she used to report on aspects of her concentration camp experiences.

=== "Home" to Paris ===
In November 1945, again legally stateless, Eva Busch managed to get a seat on a plane returning to the only city where she really felt at home. In Paris, initially she was able to sing only to American troops, but once her identity papers had been sorted out she was able to sing to the French public and on radio broadcasts. On 6 January 1946, through a friend, she met the "Paris-Soir" journalist and resistance hero George Sinclair. As Eva Busch later (and repeatedly) stated, it was "love at first sight". The two of them would stay together till Sinclair's death on 19 May 1984. Sinclair wrote poems which Busch included in her musical repertoire, as she pursued a career as a German dark timbered singer concentrating on the chanson genre. It was only in 1982, when Sinclair fell ill, that she abandoned her stage career to care for her. Up till then she also had an international career as a chansonnière, travelling several times to the United States of America where she made two recordings with Bing Crosby. Closer to home she toured in the Netherlands and France and also made brief trips across the Rhine, appearing in the radio and television studios back in West Germany where she was perceived as exotic, francophile and "very literary", and thereby outside the mainstream of contemporary German singers in the chanson genre.

In 1984, following Sinclair's death, she moved back to Germany, making her home in Munich. She continued to make media appearances in both France and Germany. Eva Busch died in Munich on 20 July 2001.
