= Kinderhymne =

1950 East German patriotic song

"Kinderhymne" (Children's Hymn) is a poem by Bertolt Brecht, written in 1950 and set to music by Hanns Eisler in the same year.

== History ==
The hymn was Brecht's response to the "Deutschlandlied", which he believed to be corrupted by the Third Reich and whose third stanza became the national anthem of West Germany in 1950. There are several allusions to the "Deutschlandlied": "From the Meuse to the Memel, / From the Adige to the Belt" vs. Brecht's "From the ocean to the Alps, / From the Oder to the Rhine", or "Germany, Germany above all" vs. "we desire to be not above, and not below other peoples". East Germany already had an anthem by the time Brecht wrote the poem and West Germany was in the process of re-adapting the third stanza of the Deutschlandlied as the national anthem by then – Brecht's writing of the text was a reaction in part to West German Chancellor Konrad Adenauer having the song played at official functions in 1950.

The verse form and the rhyme scheme are similar to both the "Deutschlandlied" and "Auferstanden aus Ruinen", the national anthem of East Germany. Accordingly, the three lyrics can be combined with the melodies.

In order to create a new all-German national anthem during the German reunification, several public campaigns supported the use of the "Kinderhymne". However, those suggestions were not taken on board; the hymn remained the same. While the Basic Law of Germany establishes a coat of arms and flag, it does not formally establish a national anthem. The anthem was decided upon and reconfirmed by an exchange of open letters between chancellor and president (Konrad Adenauer and Theodor Heuss in the early years of West Germany, and Helmut Kohl writing to Richard von Weizsäcker following reunification).

== Text and music ==
Note that the English translation is poetic, not literal.

Anmut sparet nicht noch Mühe,
Leidenschaft nicht noch Verstand,
dass ein gutes Deutschland blühe
wie ein andres gutes Land.

Dass die Völker nicht erbleichen
wie vor einer Räuberin,
sondern ihre Hände reichen
uns wie andern Völkern hin.

Und nicht über und nicht unter
andern Völkern woll'n wir sein
von der See bis zu den Alpen,
von der Oder bis zum Rhein.

Und weil wir dies Land verbessern,
lieben und beschirmen wir's.
Und das Liebste mag's uns scheinen
so wie andern Völkern ihr's.

Grace spare not and spare no labour,
passion nor intelligence,
that a decent German nation
flourish as do other lands.

That the people give up flinching
at the crimes which we evoke,
and hold out their hands in friendship
as they do to other folk.

Neither over nor yet under
other peoples will we be
from the Oder to the Rhineland,
from the Alps to the North Sea.

And because we'll make it better,
let us guard and love our home.
Love it as our dearest country
as the others love their own.

== See also ==
- 1950 in poetry
