= Erich Weinert =

German politician and writer (1890–1953)

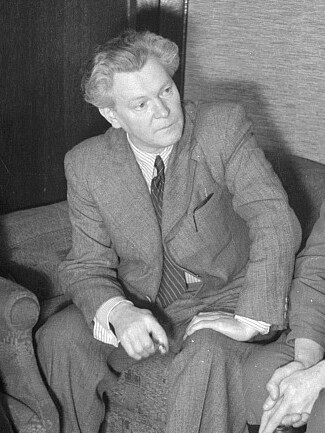
- Weinert in 1946

President of the National Committee for a Free Germany
- In office 12 July 1943 – 2 November 1945
- Vice President: Walther von Seydlitz-Kurzbach
- Preceded by: Position established
- Succeeded by: Position abolished

Personal details
- Born: Erich Bernhard Gustav Weinert; August 4, 1890 Magdeburg, German Empire
- Died: April 20, 1953 (aged 62) East Berlin, German Democratic Republic
- Party: KPD (1929–1946)

Military service
- Allegiance: German Empire
- Branch/service: Imperial German Army
- Battles/wars: World War I

Erich Bernhard Gustav Weinert (4 August 1890 – 20 April 1953) was a German Communist writer, poet and a member of the Communist Party of Germany (KPD).

== Early life ==
Weinert was born in 1890 in Magdeburg to a family supporting the Social Democratic Party of Germany. He attended a boys' school in Magdeburg and, from 1908 to 1910, he visited the arts, crafts and trade school in the city and went to an art school in Berlin in 1912. He later joined the military, where he participated as an officer during World War I. It was during his time as a soldier that he was attracted to the revolutionary ideology. After the war, he went to Leipzig and worked as an actor and lecture artist, joining the Communist Party of Germany in 1929. Meanwhile, he made various works.

== Literary career ==
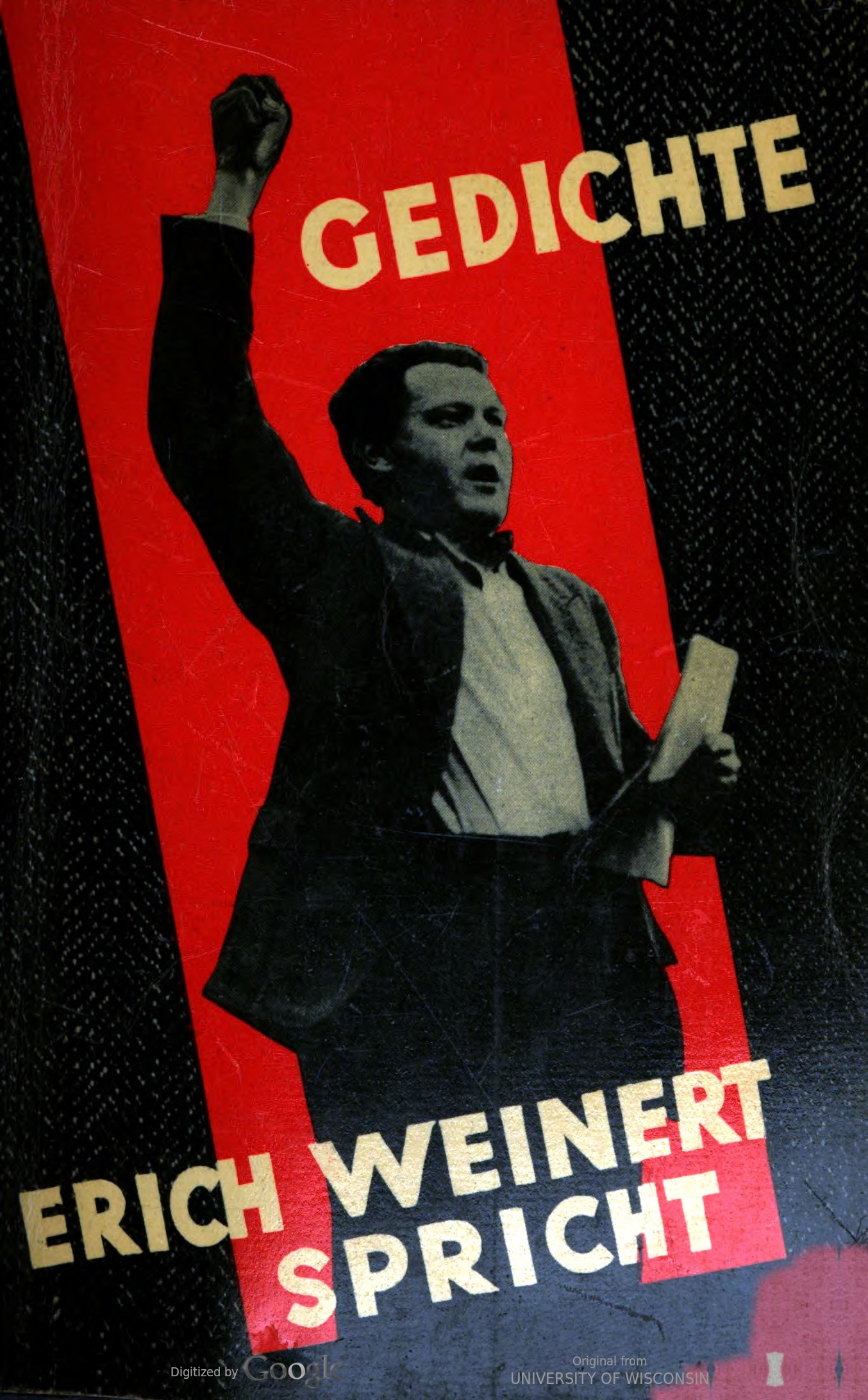
Weinert on the cover of Erich Weinert Spricht: Gedichte (1930)

Weinert started writing in 1921. From the very beginning, his poems were thoroughly anti-imperialist. In the second half of the 1920s, Weinert's work leaned towards portraying the struggles of the German proletariat. In 1929, he joined the Communist Party of Germany. Weinert's works were always political, and the role of political poet, agitator, and satirist were gradually assumed, as best seen in his collections Theater of the Apes (1925) and Erich Weinert Speaks (1930).

== Exile and fight against fascism ==
Following the Nazi assumption of power, Weinert fled to Switzerland. From 1933 to 1935, Weinert, with his wife and daughter, Marianne Lange-Weinert, went into exile in the Saar protectorate. From there, he went to Paris, France, and so he would be able to arrive in the Soviet Union. Working in the Soviet Union, he published an anthology of anti-fascist poems in 1934, 'The Cobblestones and The Day Will Come'. He became a member of the International Brigades in the Spanish Civil War from 1937 to 1939, where he was active as a front correspondent and wrote battle poems. In July 1937 he attended the Second International Writers' Congress, the purpose of which was to discuss the attitude of intellectuals to the war, held in Valencia, Barcelona and Madrid and attended by many writers including André Malraux, Ernest Hemingway, Stephen Spender and Pablo Neruda. He turned his experience on the Spanish front into poems, which were published in the book Camaradas (1951).

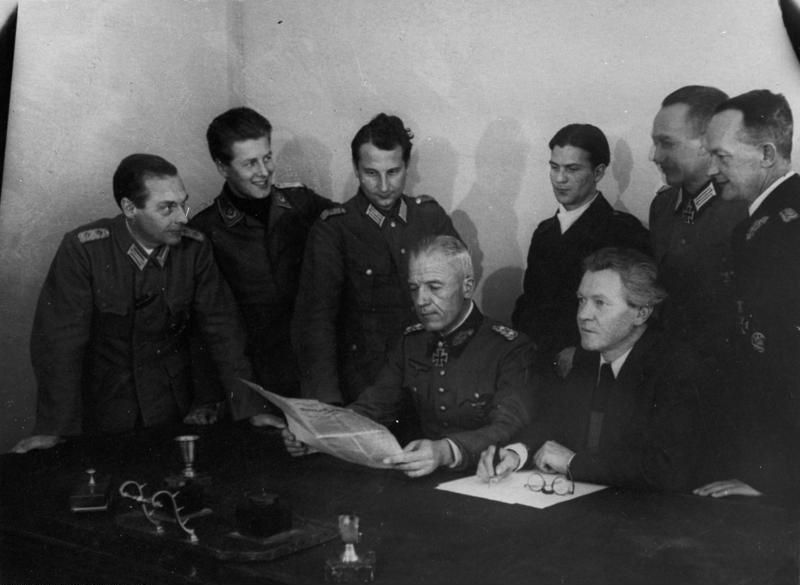
Weinert (seated, right) with Walther von Seydlitz-Kurzbach and other members of the National Committee for a Free Germany, 1943

After Germany attacked the Soviet Union, Weinert sided with the Soviets and began creating propaganda to encourage soldiers in the Wehrmacht to abandon their positions using methods such as poems printed on handbills that were thrown off behind the German lines as well as making pleas to them via the radio and shouting slogans from the rubble of Stalingrad. He wrote the text to 'Alle Waffen gegen Hitler' ('All weapons against Hitler'), a song urging German soldiers to turn against Hitler. In 1943 he was selected as the president of the National Committee for a Free Germany. Once again the time spent on the front lines found literary expression. Weinert published his war diary under the title 'Remember Stalingrad' in 1943. Two short stories – 'Death for the Fatherland' and 'Expediency' – came out in 1942. A collection of leaflet poems written during the war came out in 1944 as 'Against the Real Enemy'. In 1947, he also published 'Chapter Two of World History: Poems About the Land of Socialism', an anthology of poems about the Soviet Union.

== Return to Germany ==
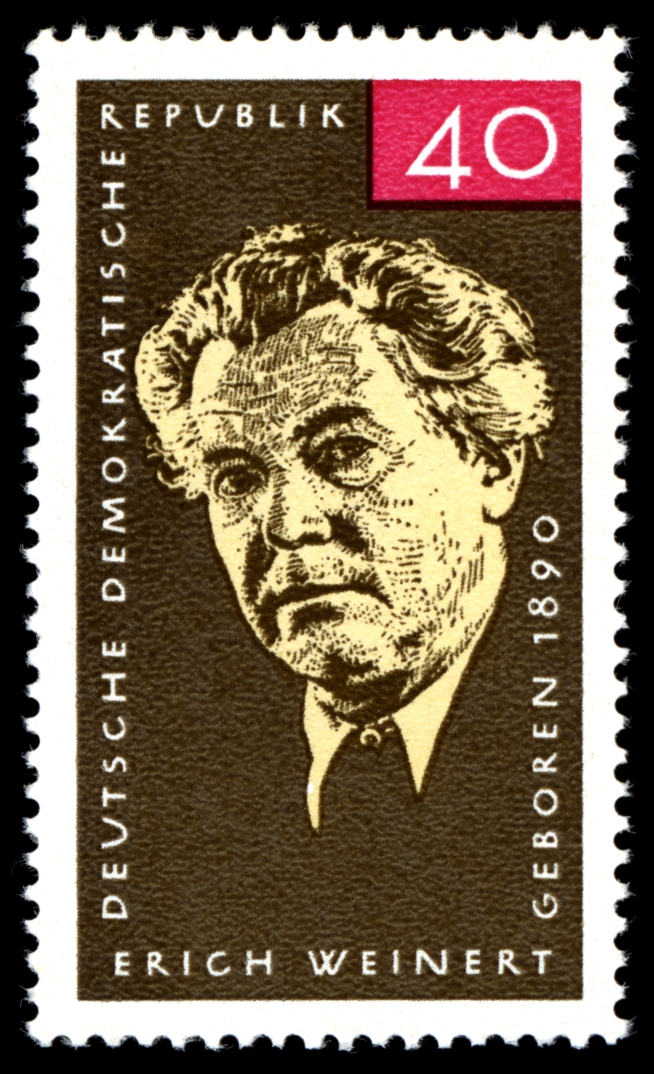
Weinert portrayed on a 1963 DDR stamp

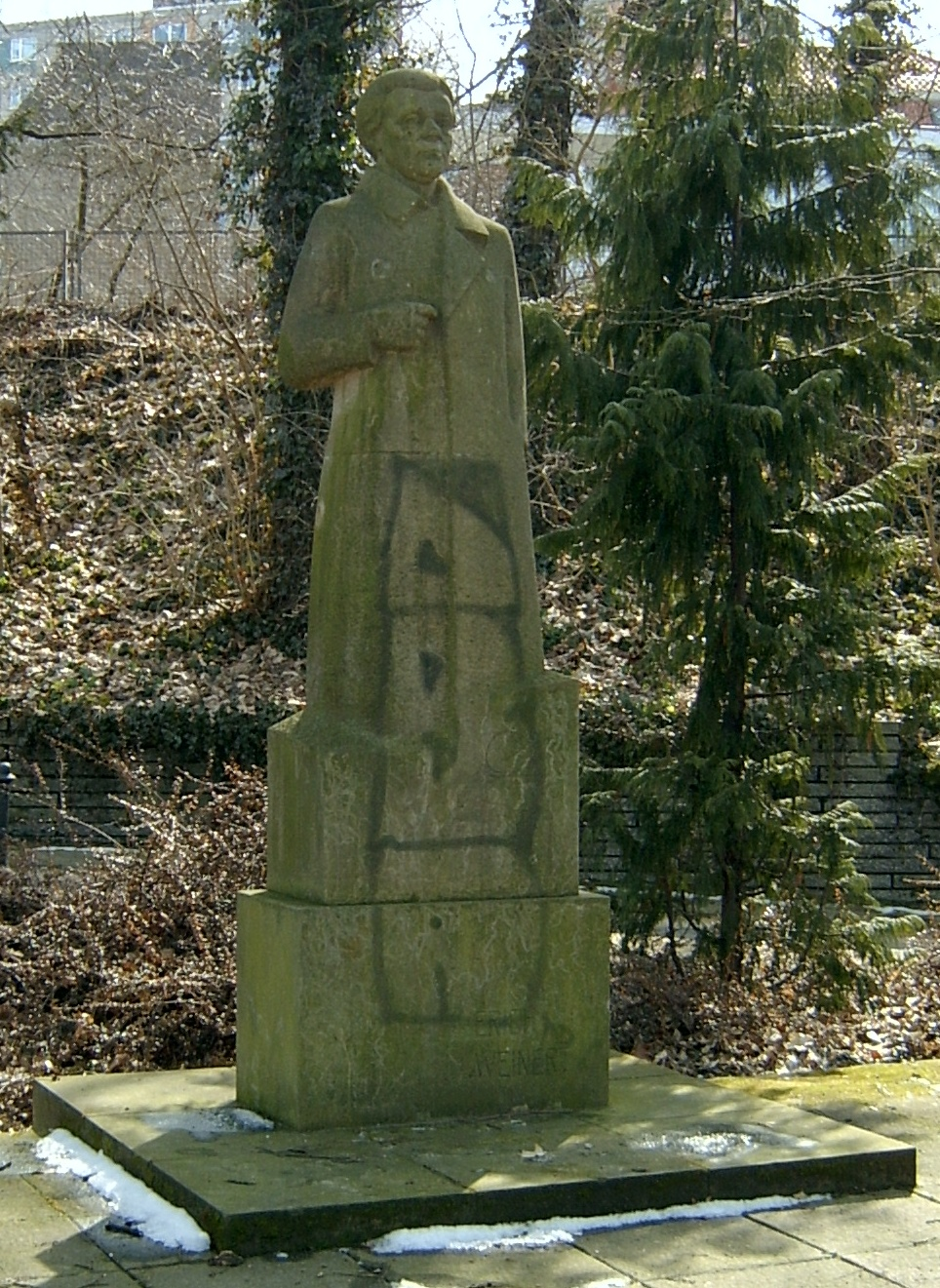
Statue of Weinert in Frankfurt/Oder

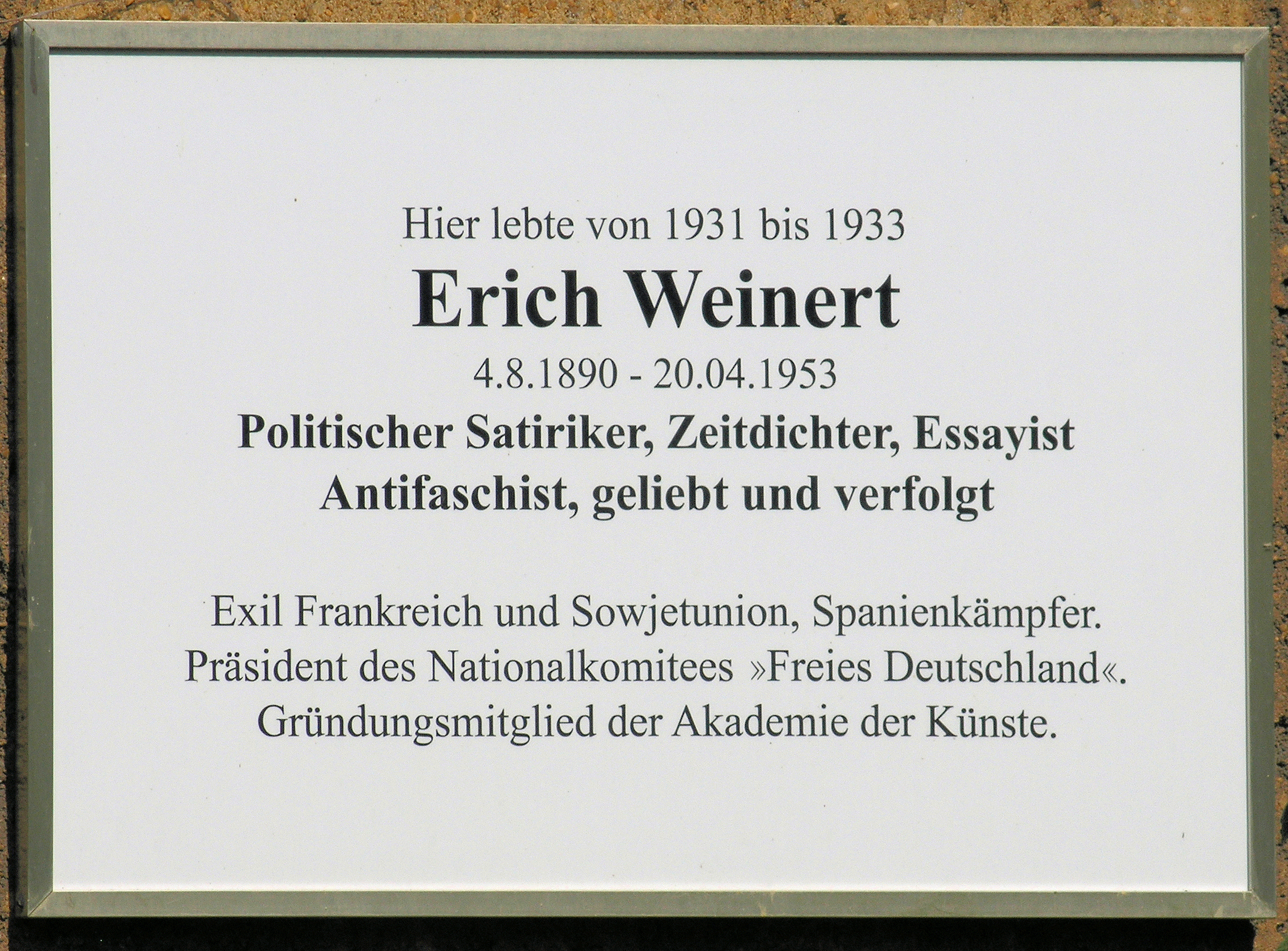
Memorial plaque of Erich Weinert in Wilmersdorf, Berlin.

In 1946 he returned to Germany in a sickly state. Regardless, he served actively as vice-president of the Central Administration for National Education in the Soviet Occupation Zone. In recognition of his work, he was awarded the National Prize in 1949 and 1952. He was also elected into the position of a member of the German Academy of Arts. He continued to publish works until his death at the age of 62 in 1953. He was cremated and honoured with burial at the Memorial to the Socialists (German: Gedenkstätte der Sozialisten) in the Friedrichsfelde Central Cemetery, Berlin.

== Selected writings ==
- Affentheater. Gedichte. Leon Hirsch Verlag, Berlin 1925.
- Erich Weinert spricht. Gedichte. Internationaler Arbeiter-Verlag, Berlin, Wien, Zürich 1930.
- Rufe in die Nacht. Gedichte aus der Fremde 1933–1943. Volk und Welt, Berlin 1950.
- Memento Stalingrad. Ein Frontnotizbuch. Volk und Welt, Berlin 1951.
- Camaradas. Ein Spanienbuch. Volk und Welt, Berlin 1952
- Gesammelte Werke. (9 Bände), herausgegeben 1955–1960.
- Gesammelte Gedichte. (7 Bände), herausgegeben 1970–1987.
- Der verbogene Zeitspiegel.
- Der Gottesgnadenhecht und andere Abfälle.
- Der heimliche Aufmarsch.
- Der unzüchtige Zille.
- Des reichen Mannes Frühlingstag.
- Das Nationalkomitee Freies Deutschland 1943–1945. Rütten & Loening, Berlin 1957.
- Poesiealbum 5. Verlag Neues Leben, Berlin 1968.
