= Hanns Eisler =

Austrian and German composer (1898–1962)

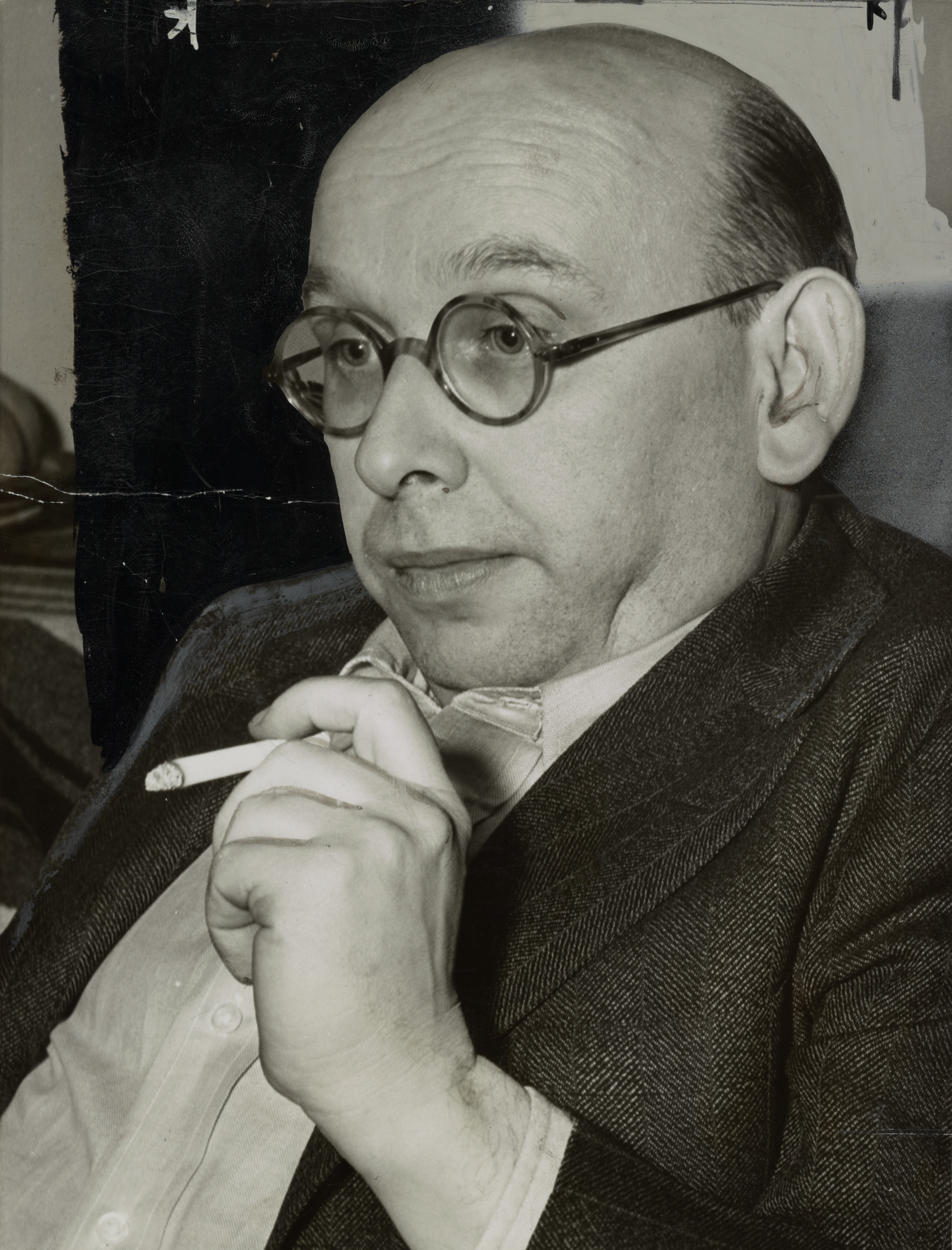
- Eisler in 1940
- Born: 6 July 1898; Leipzig, Saxony, German Empire
- Died: 6 September 1962 (aged 64); East Berlin, East Germany
- Occupation: Composer

Hanns Eisler (German pronunciation: [ˈhans ˈaɪslɐ]; 6 July 1898 – 6 September 1962) was an Austrian and German composer. He is best known for composing the national anthem of East Germany, for his long artistic association with Bertolt Brecht, and for the scores he wrote for films. The Hochschule für Musik Hanns Eisler Berlin is named after him.

== Family background ==
Johannes Eisler was born in Leipzig, Saxony, on 6 July 1898 – the third child of Rudolf Eisler and Marie Ida Fischer. His father was a philosophy professor and an atheist of Jewish descent, and his mother was Lutheran of Swabian descent. In 1901, the family moved to Vienna. His older brother Gerhart was a communist journalist, and his older sister Elfriede was a leader of the Communist Party of Germany in the 1920s. After emigrating to North America, she turned into an anti-Stalinist and testified against him and his brother before the House Un-American Activities Committee.

== Early years ==
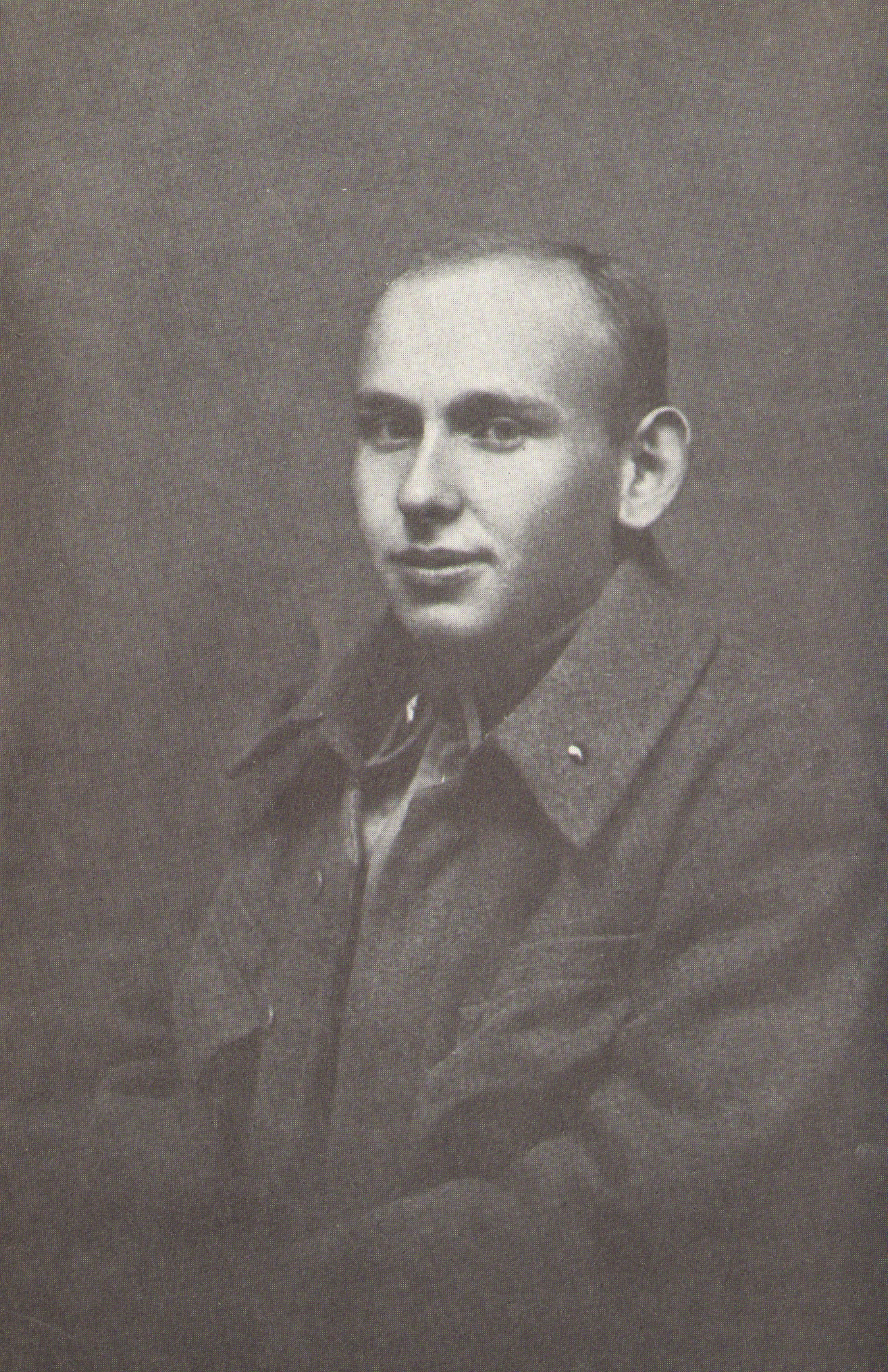
Eisler in uniform, 1917

As his family could not afford music lessons nor a piano, Eisler had to teach himself music. At age 14, Eisler joined a socialist youth group.

In 1917, one year after Eisler graduated high school, the 18-year-old Eisler was drafted into the Austro-Hungarian Army to fight during World War I, where he served as a front-line soldier. He found this time physically demanding, due to his poor health and small stature, and was injured several times in combat.

Returning to Vienna after Austria's defeat, he studied from 1919 to 1923 under Arnold Schoenberg. Eisler was the first of Schoenberg's disciples to compose in the twelve-tone or serial technique.

Eisler married Charlotte Demant in 1920; they separated in 1934. In 1925, he moved to Berlin, which was then a hothouse of experimentation in music, theater, film, art and politics. There he became an active supporter of the Communist Party of Germany and became involved with the November Group. In 1928, he taught at the Marxist Workers' School in Berlin and his son Georg Eisler was born. His music became increasingly oriented towards political themes and, to Schoenberg's dismay, more "popular" in style with influences drawn from jazz and cabaret. At the same time, he became close with Bertolt Brecht, whose own turn towards Marxism happened at about the same time. The collaboration between the two artists lasted for the rest of Brecht's life.

In 1929, Eisler composed the song cycle Zeitungsausschnitte, Op. 11. The work is dedicated to the singer Margot Hinnenberg-Lefebre. Though not written in the twelve-tone technique, it was perhaps the forerunner of a musical art style later known as "News Items" (or perhaps better characterized as "news clippings") – musical compositions that parodied a newspaper's content and style, or that included lyrics lifted directly from newspapers, leaflets, magazines or other written media of the day. The cycle parodies a newspaper's layout and content, with the songs comprising it given titles similar to headlines. Its content reflects Eisler's socialist leanings, with lyrics memorializing the struggles of ordinary Germans subject to post–World War I hardships.

Eisler wrote music for several Brecht plays, including The Decision (Die Maßnahme) (1930), The Mother (1932) and Schweik in the Second World War (1957). They also collaborated on protest songs that celebrated, and contributed to, the political turmoil of Weimar Germany in the early 1930s. Their "Solidarity Song" became a popular militant anthem sung in street protests and public meetings throughout Europe, and their "Ballad of Paragraph 218" was the world's first song protesting laws against abortion. Brecht-Eisler songs of this period tended to look at life from "below"—from the perspective of prostitutes, hustlers, the unemployed and the working poor. From 1931 to 1932, he collaborated with Brecht and director Slatan Dudow on the working-class film Kuhle Wampe.

== Exile ==
After 1933, Eisler's music and Brecht's poetry were banned by the Nazi Party. Both artists went into exile. While Brecht settled in Svendborg, Denmark, Eisler traveled for a number of years, working in Prague, Vienna, Paris, London, and Moscow, and living briefly in Spain, Mexico, and Denmark. He made two visits to the United States, with speaking tours from coast to coast.

In 1934, Eisler composed music for a song written by Brecht called the "United Front Song". The song was simple to follow to allow workers with limited musical training to be able to sing it.

In 1938, the Eislers emigrated to the United States with a permanent visa. In New York City, he taught composition at The New School for Social Research and wrote experimental chamber and documentary music. In 1942, he moved to Los Angeles where he joined Brecht, who had arrived in California in 1941 after a long trip eastward from Denmark across the Soviet Union and the Pacific Ocean.

In the US, Eisler composed music for various documentary films and for eight Hollywood film scores, two of which – Hangmen Also Die! and None but the Lonely Heart – were nominated for Oscars in 1944 and 1945 respectively. Also working on Hangmen Also Die! was Bertolt Brecht, who wrote the story along with director Fritz Lang. From 1927 to the end of his life, Eisler wrote the music for 40 films, making film music the largest part of his compositions after vocal music for chorus and/or solo voices.

On 1 February 1940, he began work on the "Research Program on the Relation between Music and Films" funded by a grant from the Rockefeller Foundation, which he got with the help of film director Joseph Losey and The New School. This work resulted in the book Composing for the Films which was published in 1947, with Theodor W. Adorno as co-author.

In several chamber and choral compositions of this period, Eisler returned to the twelve-tone method he had abandoned in Berlin. His Fourteen Ways of Describing the Rain, composed for Arnold Schoenberg's 70th birthday celebration, is considered a masterpiece of the genre.

Eisler's works of the 1930s and 1940s included Deutsche Sinfonie, a choral symphony in 11 movements based on poems by Brecht and Ignazio Silone, and a cycle of art songs published as the Hollywood Songbook. With lyrics by Brecht, Eduard Mörike, Friedrich Hölderlin, and Goethe, it established Eisler's reputation as one of the 20th century's great composers of German lieder.

== HUAC investigation ==
Eisler's promising career in the U.S. was interrupted by the Cold War. He was one of the first artists placed on the Hollywood blacklist by the film studio bosses. In two interrogations by the House Committee on Un-American Activities, the composer was accused of being "the Karl Marx of music" and the chief Soviet agent in Hollywood. Among his accusers was his sister Ruth Fischer, who also testified before the Committee that her other brother, Gerhart, was a Communist agent.

=== His supporters ===
Eisler's supporters—including his friend Charlie Chaplin and the composers Igor Stravinsky, Aaron Copland and Leonard Bernstein—organized benefit concerts to raise money for his defense fund, but to no avail. Eisler was deported early in 1948. His deportation disrupted a number of collaborations, such as composing a new film score for Chaplin's 1928 The Circus, the last Tramp movie, which Chaplin had requested. Eisler turned the score in the 1950s into concert music, which would be performed. Folksinger Woody Guthrie protested the composer's deportation in his lyrics for "Eisler on the Go"—recorded 50 years later by Billy Bragg and Wilco in the 1998 album Mermaid Avenue. In the song, an introspective Guthrie asked himself what he would do if called to testify before the House Committee on Un-American Activities: "I don't know what I'll do / I don't know what I'll do / Eisler's on the come and go / and I don't know what I'll do."

=== On departing from the U.S. ===
On 26 March 1948, Eisler and his wife Lou departed from LaGuardia Airport and flew to Prague. Before he left, he read the following statement:

I leave this country not without bitterness and infuriation. I could well understand it when in 1933 the Hitler bandits put a price on my head and drove me out. They were the evil of the period; I was proud at being driven out. But I feel heartbroken over being driven out of this beautiful country in this ridiculous way.

== In East Germany ==
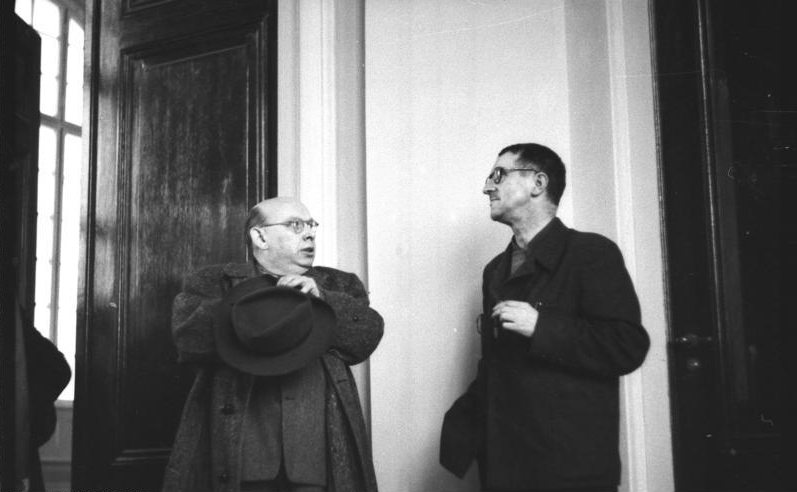
Hanns Eisler (left) and Bertolt Brecht, his close friend and collaborator, East Berlin, 1950

Eisler returned to Austria, and later moved to East Berlin. In East Germany, he composed the national anthem of the German Democratic Republic, as well as a cycle of cabaret-style songs to satirical poems by Kurt Tucholsky, and incidental music for theater, films, television and party celebrations.

His most ambitious project of the period was the opera Johannes Faustus on the Faust theme. The libretto, written by Eisler himself, was published in the autumn of 1952. It portrayed Faust as an indecisive man who betrayed the cause of the working class by not joining the German Peasants' War. In May 1953, Eisler's libretto was attacked by a major article in Neues Deutschland, the SED organ, which disapproved of the negative depiction of Faust as a renegade and accused the work of being "a slap in the face of German national feeling" and of having "formalistically deformed one of the greatest works of our German poet Goethe" (Ulbricht). Eisler's opera project was discussed in three of the bi-weekly meetings "Mittwochsgesellschaft" [Wednesday club] of a circle of intellectuals under the auspices of the Berlin Academy of Arts beginning on 13 May 1953. The last of these meetings took place on Wednesday, 10 June 1953.

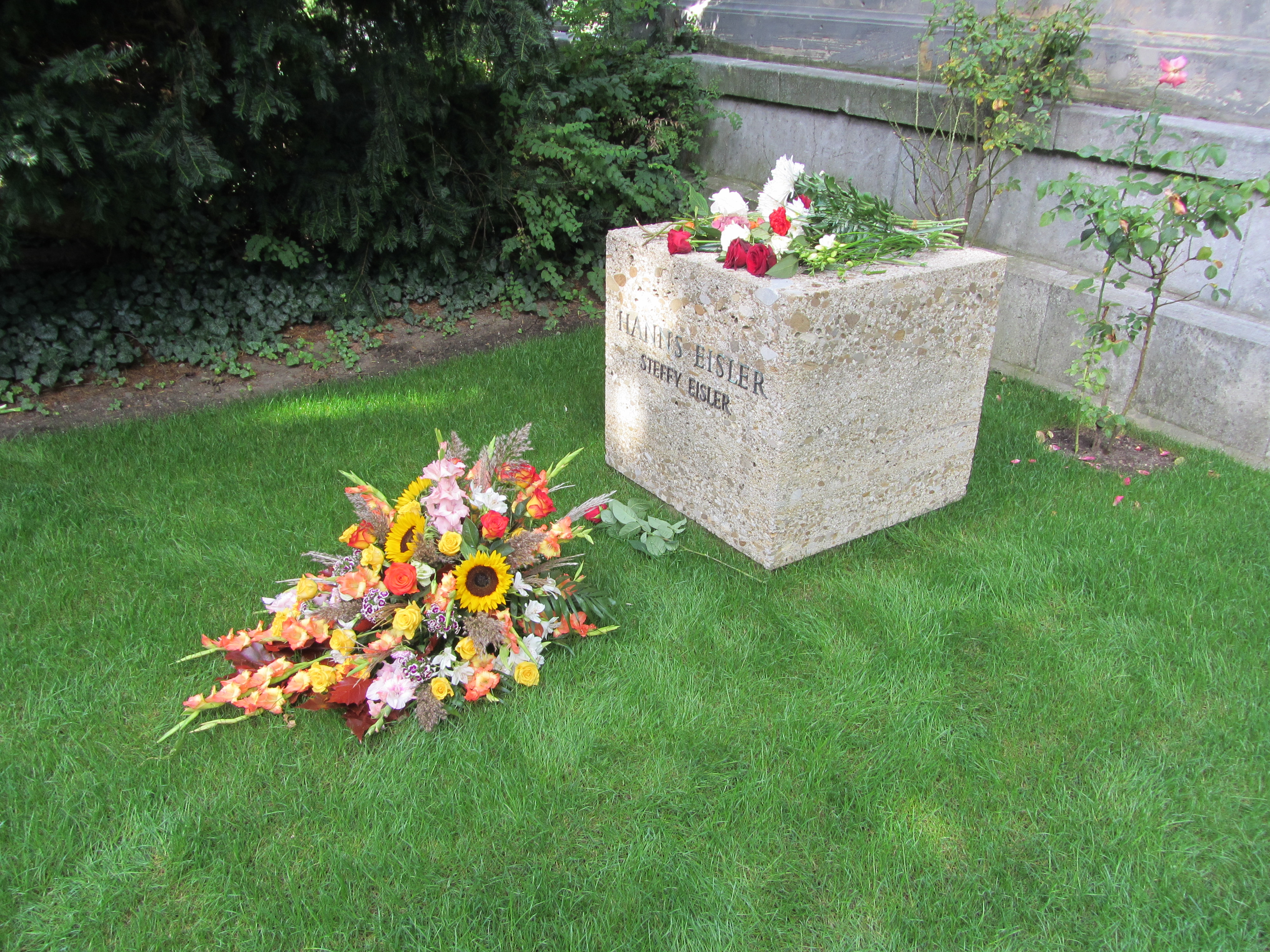
Grave of honor of Eisler and his third wife Stephanie (Steffy) Wolf at the Dorotheenstadt Cemetery

A week later, the East German uprising of 1953 pushed those debates from the agenda. Eisler fell into a deep depression, and consequently did not write the music for the opera. In his last work, "Ernste Gesänge" ('Serious Songs'), written between spring 1961 and August 1962, Eisler attempted to work through his depression, taking up the 20th Congress of the Communist Party of the Soviet Union with its demise of the Stalin cult, as a sign of hope for a future enabling to "live without fear". Although he continued to work as a composer and to teach at the East Berlin conservatory, the gap between Eisler and the cultural functionaries of East Germany grew wider in the last decade of his life. During this period, he befriended musician Wolf Biermann and tried to promote him, but in 1976, Biermann would be stripped of his GDR citizenship while on concert tour in West Germany.

Eisler collaborated with Brecht until the latter's death in 1956. He never recovered completely from his friend's demise, and his remaining years were marred by depression and declining health.

== Illness and death ==
On 6 September 1962, Eisler died of a heart attack in East Berlin at the age of 64, and is buried near Brecht in the Dorotheenstadt cemetery. He had been bedridden for three months after his first heart attack. He had been a heavy smoker since he was a child, smoking up to 100 cigarettes a day on occasion. He became a heavy drinker later in life and developed alcoholism. He had slept very little and ate poorly, and as a result he also suffered from chronic fatigue and malnutrition.

== Compositions ==
- 1918: Gesang des Abgeschiedenen ("Die Mausefalle") (after Christian Morgenstern); "Wenn es nur einmal so ganz still wäre" (after Rainer Maria Rilke)
- 1919: Drei Lieder (Li-Tai-Po, Klabund); "Sehr leises Gehn im lauen Wind";
- 1922: Allegro moderato and Waltzes; Allegretto and Andante for Piano
- 1923: Piano Sonata No. 1, Op. 1
- 1923: Divertimento; Four Piano Pieces
- 1923: Divertimento for wind quintet, Op. 4
- 1924: Piano Sonata No. 2, Op. 6
- 1925: Eight Piano Pieces
- 1926: Tagebuch des Hanns Eisler (Diary of Hanns Eisler); 11 Zeitungsausschnitte; Ten Lieder; Three Songs for Men's Chorus (after Heinrich Heine)
- 1928: "Drum sag der SPD ade"; "Lied der roten Matrosen" ("Song of the Red Sailors", with Erich Weinert); Pantomime (with Béla Balázs); "Kumpellied"; "Red Sailors' Song"; "Couplet vom Zeitfreiwilligen"; "Newspaper's Son"; "Auch ein Schumacher (verschiedene Dichter)"; "Was möchst du nicht" (from Des Knaben Wunderhorn); "Wir sind das rote Sprachrohr"
- Between 1929 and 1931: "Solidaritätslied"
- 1929: Tempo der Zeit (Tempo of Time) for chorus and small orchestra, Op. 16; Six Lieder (after Weinert, Weber, Jahnke and Vallentin); "Lied der Werktätigen" ("Song of the Working People"; with Stephan Hermlin)
- 1930: Die Maßnahme (The Measures Taken, Lehrstück, text by Bertolt Brecht), Op. 20; Six Ballads (after Weber, Brecht, and Walter Mehring); Four Ballads (after B. Traven, Kurt Tucholsky, Wiesner-Gmeyner, and Arendt); Suite No. 1, Op. 23
- 1931 incidental music for Die Mutter (The Mother) by Bertolt Brecht (after Maxim Gorky), for small theatre orchestra
- 1931: "Lied der roten Flieger" (after Semyon Kirsanov); Four Songs (after Frank, Weinert) from the film Niemandsland; film music for Kuhle Wampe (texts by Brecht) with the famous "Ballad of the Pirates", "Song of Mariken", Four Ballads (with Bertolt Brecht); Suite No. 2, Op. 24 ("Niemandsland"); Three Songs after Erich Weinert; "Das Lied vom vierten Mann" ("The Song of the Fourth Man"); "Streiklied" ("Strike Song"); Suite No. 3, Op. 26 ("Kuhle Wampe")
- 1932: Kleine Sinfonie, Op. 29
- 1932: "Ballad of the Women and the Soldiers" (with Brecht); Seven Piano Pieces; Suite No. 4, Music for the Russian film Pesn' o geroyakh (Song of Heroes) by Joris Ivens with "Song from the Urals" (after Sergei Tretyakov); reissued as instrumental piece Op. 30 ("Die Jugend hat das Wort")
- 1934: "Einheitsfrontlied" ("United Front Song"); "Saarlied" ("Saar Song"), "Lied gegen den Krieg" ("Song Against War"), "Ballade von der Judenhure Marie Sanders" ("Ballad of the Jews' Whore Marie Sanders"), songs from Die Rundköpfe und die Spitzköpfe; "Sklave, wer wird dich befreien" ("Slave, who will liberate you"; with Brecht); "California Ballad"; Six Pieces; Prelude and Fugue on B–A–C–H (string trio); Spartakus 1919, Op. 43
- 1935: Die Mutter (The Mother) rewritten as cantata for chorus, solo voices and two pianos for a New York stage production
- 1935: Lenin Requiem for solo voices, chorus and orchestra
- 1936: Cantata Gegen den Krieg
- 1937: Seven cantatas based on texts taken from Ignazio Silone's novels Bread and Wine and Fontamara for solo voice, strings and woodwind instruments

Die Römische Kantate, Op. 60;
Kantate im Exil (Man lebt von einem Tag zu dem andern), Op. 62;
Kantate "Nein" (Kantate im Exil No. 2);
Kantate auf den Tod eines Genossen, Op. 64;
Kriegskantate, Op. 65;
Die den Mund auf hatten;
Die Weißbrotkantate.

- "Friedenssong" ("Peace Song", after Petere); "Kammerkantaten" ("Chamber Cantatas"); Ulm 1592; "Bettellied "("Begging Song", with Brecht); "Lenin Requiem" (with Brecht)
- 1938: Cantata on Herr Meyers' First Birthday
- 1938: String Quartet
- 1938: Fünf Orchesterstücke
- 1938: Theme and Variations "Der lange Marsch"
- 1939: Nonet No. 1
- 1940: Music for the documentary film White Flood (Frontier Films); incidental music for the Broadway play Medicine Show
- 1941: Music for the documentary film A Child went forth (directed by Joseph Losey), reissued as Suite for Septet No. 1, op. 92a
- 1940/41: Film music for The Forgotten Village (directed by Herbert Kline and Alexander Hammid, written by John Steinbeck)
- 1940/41: Nonet No. 2
- 1941: Woodbury-Liederbüchlein (Woodbury Songbook, 20 children songs for female choir written in Woodbury, Connecticut); "14 Arten den Regen zu beschreiben" (14 ways to describe rain) (inspired by the Joris Ivens film Rain (1929), later dedicated to Arnold Schoenberg for his 70th birthday)
- 1942: "Hollywood-Elegien" ("Hollywood Elegies"; with Brecht) in the Hollywooder Liederbuch (Hollywood Songbook)
- 1943: Film music for Hangmen Also Die!; Piano Sonata No. 3
- 1943: Songs for Schweik in the Second World War; "Deutsche Misere" (with Brecht)
- 1943: Piano sonata no. 3
- 1943: Kammer-Sinfonie, Op. 69
- 1945: Film score for The Spanish Main, directed by Frank Borzage
- 1946: "Glückliche Fahrt" ("Prosperous Voyage", after Goethe); Songs and ballad for Brecht's play Life of Galileo.
- 1946: Film scores for A Scandal in Paris and Deadline at Dawn
- 1947: Septet No. 2
- 1947: Music for The Woman on the Beach, film directed by Jean Renoir
- 1948: Incidental music for Johann Nestroy's play Höllenangst
- 1948: "Lied über die Gerechtigkeit" ("Song of Justice", after W. Fischer)
- 1948: Ouvertüre zu einem Lustspiel
- 1949: Berliner-Suite; Rhapsody; "Lied über den Frieden" ("Song about Peace"); Auferstanden aus Ruinen (National Anthem of the DDR (text by Johannes R. Becher)); "Treffass"
- 1950: Neue deutsche Volkslieder, collection of songs to texts by Becher
- 1950: "Mitte des Jahrhunderts" (after Becher); Four Lieder on Die Tage der Commune; Children's Songs (with Brecht)
- 1950: "Kinderhymne" to a poem by Brecht
- 1952: "Das Lied vom Glück" ("The Song of Happiness"; after Brecht); "Das Vorbild" (after Goethe)
- 1954 : Winterschlacht-Suite
- 1955: Night and Fog, music for the film Herr Puntila and His Servant Matti; Puntila-Suite; "Im Blumengarten" ("In the flower garden"); "Die haltbare Graugans"; Three Lieder after Brecht; music for the 1955 film Bel Ami
- 1956: Vier Szenen auf dem Lande (Katzgraben) ("Four Scenes from the Country", after Erwin Strittmatter); Children's Songs (after Brecht); "Fidelio" (after Beethoven)
- 1957: Sturm-Suite für Orchester; Bilder aus der Kriegsfibel; "Die Teppichweber von Kujan-Bulak" ("The Carpetweavers of Kujan-Bulak", with Brecht); "Lied der Tankisten" (text by Weinert); "Regimenter gehn"; "Marsch der Zeit" ("March of Time", after Vladimir Mayakovsky); Three Lieder (after Mayakovsky and Peter Hacks); "Sputnik-Lied" ("Sputnik Song", text of Kuba (Kurt Barthel)); film music for Les Sorcières de Salem (The Crucible)
- 1935–1958: Deutsche Sinfonie (after texts of Bertolt Brecht and Ignazio Silone)
- 1958: "Am 1. Mai" ("To May Day", with Brecht)
- 1959: 36 more songs on texts by Kurt Tucholsky for Gisela May and Ernst Busch;
- 1962: "Ernste Gesänge" ("Serious Songs"), seven Lieder after Friedrich Hölderlin, Berthold Viertel, Giacomo Leopardi, Helmut Richter, and Stephan Hermlin

Brilliant Classics issued in 2014 the 10-CD collection Edition Hanns Eisler.

== Writings ==
- A Rebel in Music: Selected Writings. New York: International Publishers, 1978 OCLC 2632915
