= Bargiel =

Bargiel (Polish pronunciation: [ˈbarɡʲɛl] or Bargieł [ˈbarɡʲɛw], German: [ˈbarɡi:l]) is a Polish surname meaning Eurasian nuthatch. Notable people with the surname include:

- Adolph Bargiel (1783–1841), German pianist, violinist, and voice teacher, husband of Mariane, father of Woldemar
- Andrzej Bargiel (born 1988), Polish ski mountaineer
- Grzegorz Bargiel (born 1976), Polish ski mountaineer
- Janusz Bargieł (1958–2021), Polish politician
- Mariane Bargiel (1797–1872), German pianist and soprano, wife of Adolph, mother of Woldemar
- Przemysław Bargiel (born 2000), Polish footballer
- Woldemar Bargiel (1828–1897), German composer, son of Mariane and Adolph
