= Gedächtniskirche =

Gedächtniskirche (German for "Memorial Church") may refer to several different churches, among them:

- Kaiser-Friedrich-Gedächtniskirche (also known in English as Emperor Frederick Memorial Church) in Berlin
- Kaiser-Wilhelm-Gedächtniskirche (also known in English as Kaiser Wilhelm Memorial Church) in Berlin.
- Gedächtniskirche der Protestation (Memorial Church of the Protestation) in Speyer.
- Gedächtniskirche Schönefeld in Leipzig-Schönefeld,
