= Adolph Bargiel =

German musician

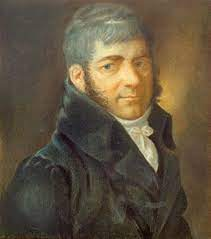
Portrait in pastels of Adolph Bargiel, 1810

August Adolph Anastasius Bargiel (born Antonius Aloysius Bargiel, 1 November 1783 – 4 February 1841) was a German pianist, violinist, and piano and voice pedagogue. Between 1825 and 1841 he was married to Mariane Tromlitz, the mother of Clara Schumann by her previous husband, Friedrich Wieck. From 1810 to 1819 he was a member of the Leipzig Gewandhaus Orchestra, where he later opened a music school. After 1826 he worked as a music teacher in Berlin.

== Life ==
Born in Bauerwitz (today Baborów), Bargiel was educated until age twelve by his father (d. 1807), who was a school rector in Bauerwitz. He was a pupil at the Gymnasium in Leobschütz (today Głubczyce) from 1795 onwards. As a child he received singing lessons from his father, as well as, for a time, piano lessons. An unknown teacher gave him cello lessons. In 1802, Bargiel became a student in Breslau (today Wrocław), where he also received violin lessons. At first he studied the law, his father standing opposed to a career in music; in 1805, he went to Halle, where he studied philosophical sciences. However, his education was interrupted in 1806 by the Napoleonic Wars, and Bargiel accepted a position as tutor to the household of Baron von Seckendorff at his home, the Zingst estate near Nebra. There he befriended Friedrich Wieck, who was also working as a tutor at the Zingst estate.

Following his father's death in 1807 Bargiel, born a Roman Catholic, converted to Protestanism and changed his name from Antonius Aloysius Bargel to August Adolph Anastasius Bargiel. In 1809 Bargiel gave up his post as tutor and resumed his legal studies at Leipzig, also taking courses in philosophy. He financed his studies by giving music lessons. His weak constitution and poor prospects as a lawyer swayed Bargiel to pursue music professionally, particularly since he had had some success as a teacher. Bargiel was a member of the Leipzig Gewandhaus Orchestra, gave private piano and singing lessons, and in 1818 opened a music school. Following a visit in 1822 to the Logier Academy in Berlin, he opened an institute of music working on the teaching principles of Johann Bernhard Logier, which he ran until 1825.

In 1825, Bargiel married Mariane Tromlitz, formerly the wife of Friedrich Wieck. They had four children: Woldemar (1828–1897), Eugen (1830–1907), Cäcilie (1832–1910) and Clementine (1835–1869). The three youngest received their first piano lessons from their mother; Woldemar had his first lessons on the piano, the organ and the violin from his father.

1826 saw Adolph und Mariane return to Berlin, where Adolph took over the direction of the Logier Academy. The academy operated successfully until 1826 but was forced to close in 1830 owing to an epidemic of cholera in Berlin. The wealthiest pupils fled to their country estates for fear of infection, causing the academy serious financial losses. Bargiel had no savings, and though he persevered in delivering lessons to his few remaining students, he found himself unable to provide securely for his family. In 1836 Bargiel suffered a stroke; he died in Berlin four years later.
