= Piano Trio (Clara Schumann) =

1846 composition by Clara Schumann

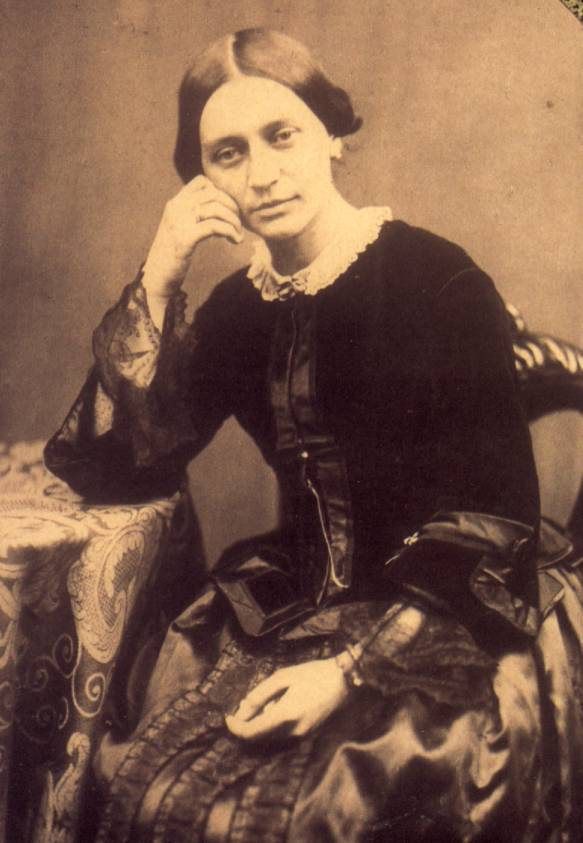
Clara Schumann in 1853

Composed in 1846, the Piano Trio in G minor, opus 17 by Clara Schumann is considered her greatest, most mature four-movement work. It is her only piano trio, composed while she lived in Dresden, following extensive studies in fugue writing and the publication of her Three Preludes and Fugues For Piano, opus 16 in 1845. The trio was premiered by the composer in Vienna on January 15, 1847.

== Background ==
Schumann began composing her trio at age twenty-five while living in Dresden in 1846. She found great joy in composing the chamber work; her second four-movement work after the Piano Sonata which is also in the same key of G minor. At the first rehearsal of the trio with a violinist and cellist, she wrote in her diary, "There is nothing greater than the joy of composing something oneself, and then listening to it."

The winter of 1847, she toured to Vienna, for the second time in her career, where she gave the trio’s premiere. Though many of her husband's works were not received well by the Viennese audiences, Schumann's trio was reviewed favorably: "The work is clear, something rarely seen; it demonstrates a calm mastery of the formal artistic medium that we would not have expected of a woman composer."

Schumann planned to dedicate it to her friend, the composer, Fanny Mendelssohn-Hensel, but Hensel died before the work's publication, so Schumann ascribed no dedication. The work was published in Leipzig in 1847 by Breitkopf and Hartel. This was her first work for instruments other than the voice and piano since her Piano Concerto in A minor of 1835.

A year after the composition of her piano trio, her husband Robert composed his first piano trio, op.63 which was greatly influenced by Clara's trio as they share many interesting similarities. Their works have been frequently paired at concerts as well as on recordings.

== Life ==
During the work’s composition, Schumann was living in Dresden due to her husband Robert Schumann's ill health. Three months before she began composing it in May of 1846, she gave birth to her fourth child, less than a year after her third child. During the summer of 1846, she traveled to Norderney in more attempts to improve her husband's health conditions. While in Norderney, Clara suffered a miscarriage before returning home to complete the work in September.

== Recordings ==
The first recording of Schumann's trio was likely by Decca in 1951. Another notable recording was made by Beaux Art Trio in 1972. The work received its first Sony Classical recording in 2022 with Anne-Sophie Mutter, Pablo Ferrández, and Lambert Orkis. Many performers, though not all, consider Schumann's trio to be as integral to the chamber music repertoire as her husband's.

== Structure ==
The composition is in four movements:

1. Allegro moderato in G minor, in common (4/4) time with a tempo of = 152.
2. Scherzo and Trio in B♭ major and E♭ major, respectively. The Scherzo is in 3/4 time and has a tempo of = 160. The Trio is also in 3/4 time and shows no change in tempo from the Scherzo.
3. Andante in G major, in 6/8 time and = 112.
4. Allegretto in G minor, in 2/4 time and = 96.

=== I. Allegro moderato ===
The overall key of this movement is G minor, with a lot of modulation both to closer and more distant keys. The structure of the movement is sonata form, with a codetta and then a coda. It is in Allegro moderato. It relies on energy and chromaticism to attract the audience. Throughout the movement, each instrument has its own soloist moment on top of an exceptional balance between three instruments. This balance makes it clear that Clara had a great understanding of writing for these three instruments although she was a pianist.

=== II. Scherzo and Trio ===
The second movement consists of three sections; Scherzo, Trio, and Scherzo. The Scherzo is in B♭ major, the relative major of the first movement, and it instructed to be played in the "Tempo di minuetto" which means slow, graceful and playful. The melody is often played by the violin, while the cello accompanies the melody through pizzicato as the piano plays chords. These contrasts between the cello and piano successfully create the mood of the "Tempo di minuetto". After Scherzo, a contrasting section, Trio, appears. It is in E♭ major and is more lyrical than Scherzo. However, the overall mood of the piece is still playful. At last, it goes back to Scherzo to finish the movement.

=== III. Andante ===
The third movement, Andante, is in G major and begins with an 8 measures piano solo. Soon after, the violin takes over the theme. In the middle of movement all three parts play dotted rhythms, which contribute to the contrast of the emotion of the piece. The piece could be described as "bittersweet".

=== IV. Allegretto ===
The last movement, Allegretto, is in sonata form again. The opening is similar to the opening theme of the first movement, which resembles "dramatic intensity". It contains a masterful fugue.

== See also ==
- List of compositions by Clara Schumann
