= Leipzig-Schönefeld =

Part of Leipzig, Germany

- Stadtteil of Leipzig
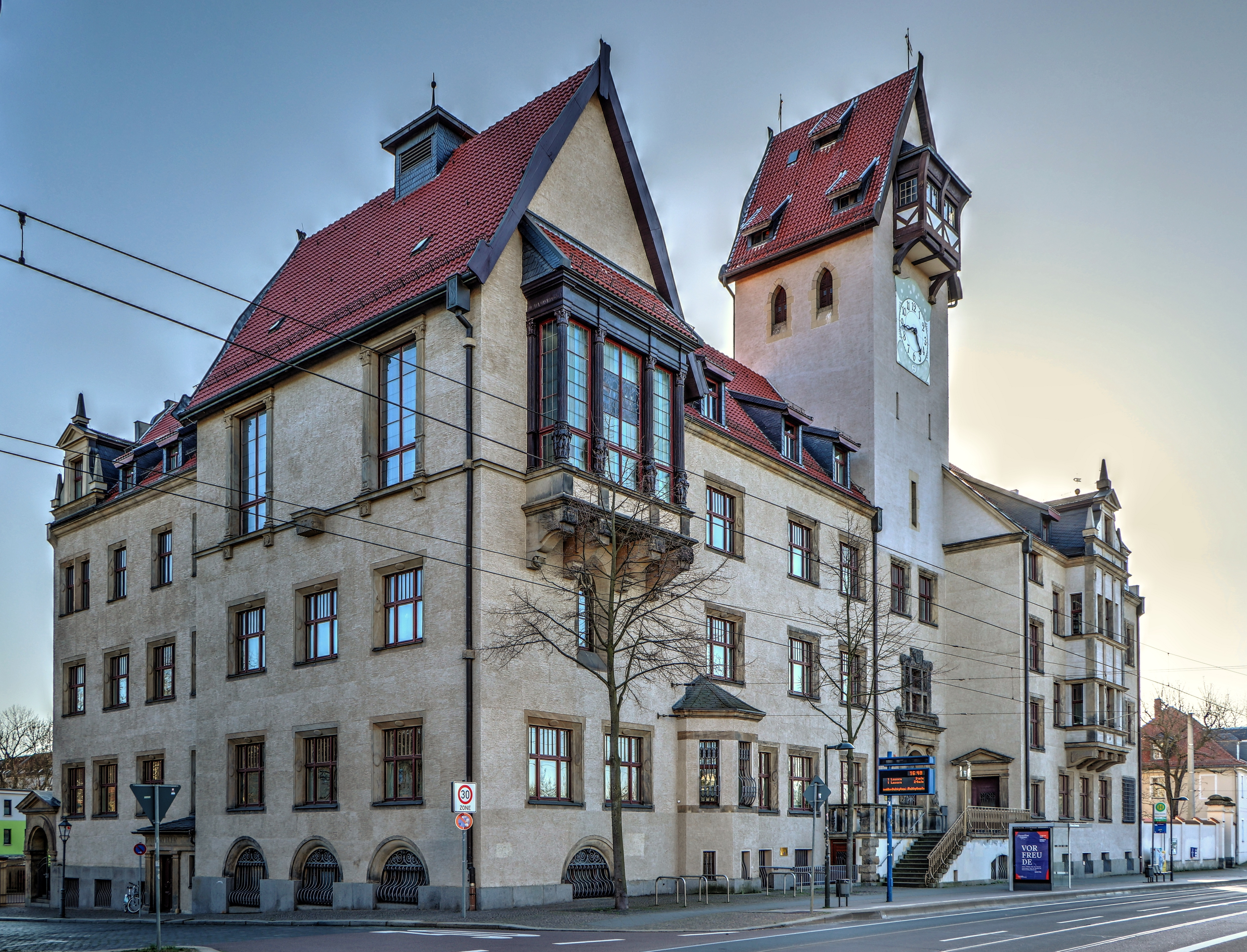
- Interactive map of Leipzig-Schönefeld
- Location within Germany Location within Saxony
- Coordinates: 51°21′30″N 12°25′30″E
- Country: Germany
- State: Saxony
- District: Urban district
- City: Leipzig

Area
  - Total: 4.11 km^{2} (1.59 sq mi)

Population (2024-12-31)
  - Total: 24,487
  - Density: 5,960/km^{2} (15,400/sq mi)
- Time zone: UTC+01:00 (CET)
  - Summer (DST): UTC+02:00 (CEST)
- Postal codes: 04347
- Dialling codes: 0341

Schönefeld (German pronunciation: [ˈʃøːnəfɛlt]) is a locality in the Northeast borough of Leipzig. Concerning administrative matters Schönefeld-Ost is a separate locality of Leipzig, while the rest of Schönefeld, together with Abtnaundorf forms a locality called Schönefeld-Abtnaundorf.

== History ==
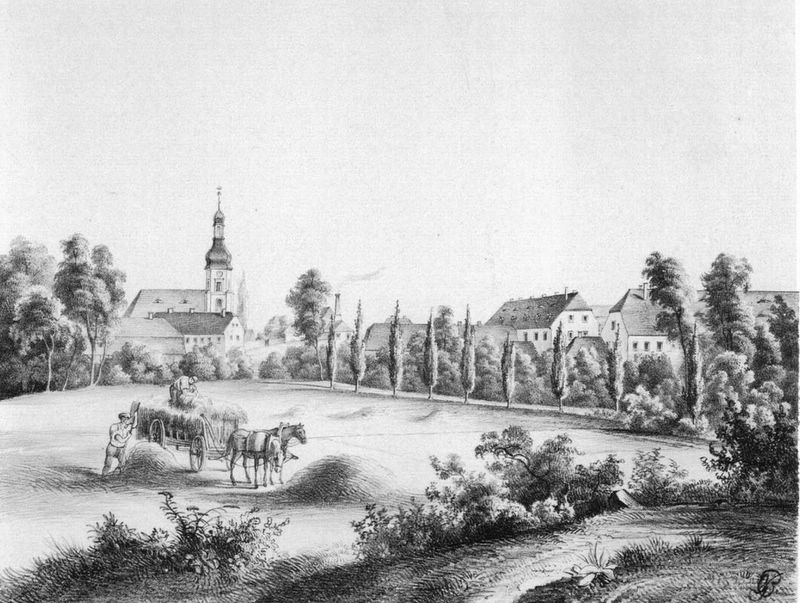
Schönefeld around 1850

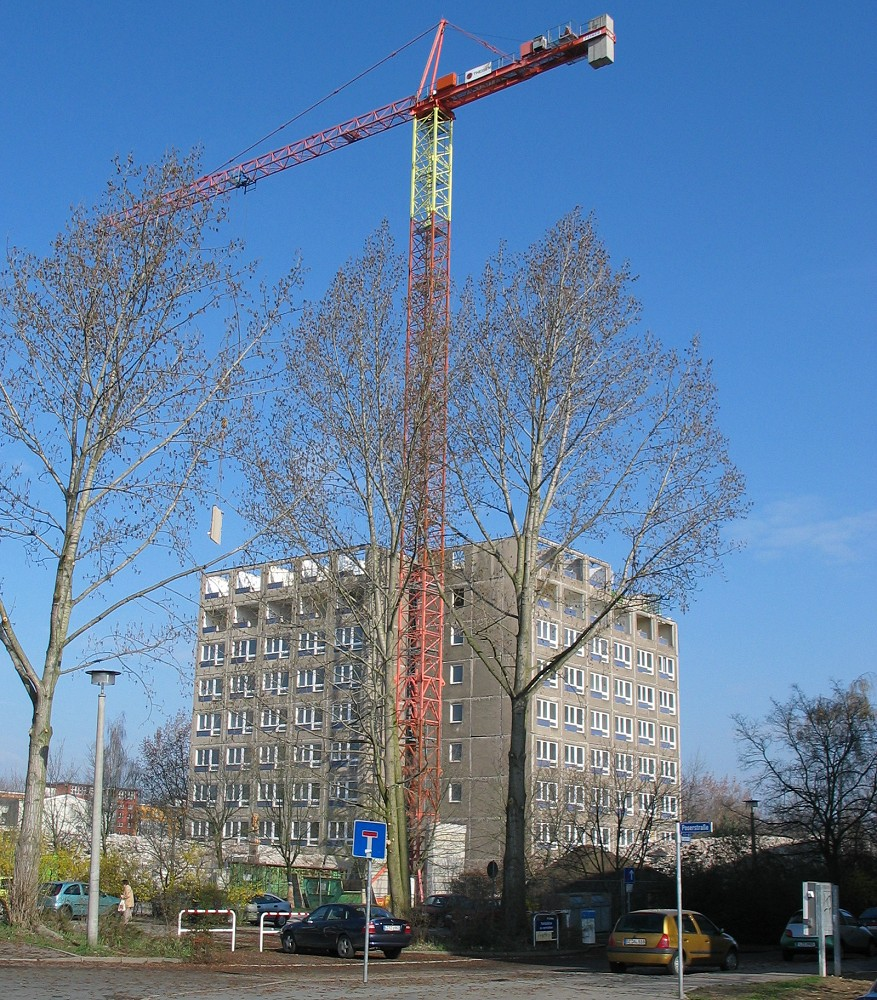
Housing destruction: Destruction of 16-level building type "Erfurt" in the street Volksgartenstraße

In 1270 the margravial village of "Schonenuelt" was mentioned the first time. From 1307 until the Reformation the village belonged to the Canons Regular of St. Augustine cloister St Thomas in Leipzig. In 1527 the village church was rebuilt after being destroyed by a fire. After devastation in the Thirty Years' War the former owner Georg H. von Thümmel ordered the rebuilding of the manor-house in baroque style. On May 27, 1738 the writer Moritz August von Thümmel was born. During the Battle of Leipzig in October 1813 the village was completely destroyed, but already in 1820 was the new building of the Protestant church opened, later named the Gedächtniskirche Schönefeld (Memorial Church). Robert Schumann and Clara Wieck married there on 12 September 1840.

During the second part of the 19th century the village turned into a suburb inhabited mainly by workers. The number of inhabitants increased from 889 in 1834 to 14,879 in 1910. Schönefeld was connected to the tram network in 1896 and was suburbanised into Leipzig in 1915.

The first catholic service after the reformation took place in 1921 and auxiliary church was built in 1928, which is still used nowadays.

In the years 1974/76 the tower block area Schönefeld-Ost, containing more than 4,000 GDR apartments, was constructed.

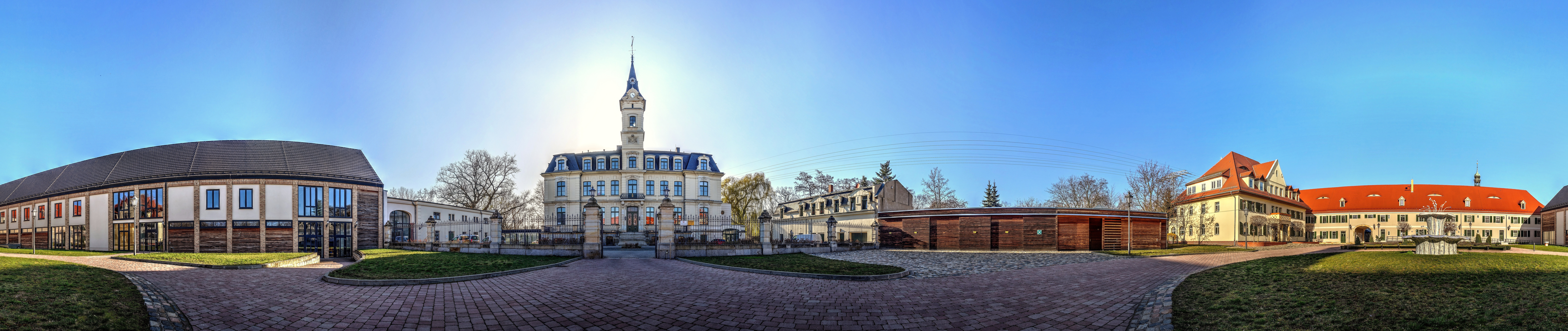
360 degree panorama of the courtyard of Schönefeld Palace. The buildings are (from left to right) Schönefeld Special School, Schönefeld Orangery, Schönefeld Palace, Coachman's House, Remise, Kindergarten and Gate House. Behind the Gate House to the east is the tower of the Gedächtniskirche. In the centre, on the right in the picture, is a mosaic sculpture "Kelch".

== Notable people ==
- Moritz August von Thümmel (1738–1817), writer, born in Schönefeld
- Albin Grau (1884–1971), architect, born in Schönefeld
- Heinz Rauch (1914–1962), politician (KPD/SED), born in Schönefeld
