= List of compositions by Clara Schumann =

This is a list of compositions by Clara Schumann, initially arranged by genre, sortable by date of completion (click on the "Comp Date" column header).

== Complete list of works ==
Opus/ WoO	Title	Instr	Comp Date	Publ Date	Notes
=== Orchestra ===
	Overture	orch	1830–32		lost
	Scherzo	orch	1830–33		lost
=== Concerto ===
Op. 7	Piano Concerto in A minor 3 movements	pf orch	1833–35	1836	
Op. 18	Piano Concerto No. 2 in F minor	pf orch	1847	1994	intended as Op. 18 but unfinished; 1st mvt only, publ. 1994 as Konzertsatz
=== Chamber ===
Op. 17	Piano Trio in G minor 4 mvts	pf vn vc	by 1846	1846	
Op. 22	(3) Romanze für Clavier und Violine	vn pf	1853	1855	
=== Piano ===
	Variationen über ein Tyroler Lied	pf	1830		lost
	Variationen über ein Original-Thema	pf	1830		lost
Op. 1	4 Polonaises: 1. E♭ major 2. C major 3. D major 4. C major	pf	1830	1831	
	Phantasie-Variationen über ein Wieck Romanze	pf	1831		lost
Op. 2	(9) Caprices en forme de valse: 1. C major 2. D major 3. E♭ major 4. A♭ major 5. B♭ major 6. C major 7. A♭ major 8. E♭ major 9. D♭ major	pf	1831–32	1832	
WoO 4	Etude in A♭	pf	1832		
Op. 3	Romance variée in C major	pf	1833	1833	
	Rondo in B minor	pf	1833		lost
Op. 4	Valses romantiques	pf	1835	1835	
Op. 5	4 Pièces caractéristiques: 1. Impromptu: Le Sabbat; 2. Caprices a la boleros 3. Romance; 4. Scene fantastique: Le Ballet des revenants	pf	1835	1836	
Op. 6	(6) Soirées musicales: 1. Toccatina in A minor 2. Notturno in F major 3. Mazurka in G minor 4. Ballade in D minor 5. Mazurka in G major 6. Polonaise in A minor	pf	1836	1836	
Op. 8	Variations de concert sur la cavatine du Pirate de Bellini	pf	1837	1837	
Op. 9	Souvenir de Vienne, Impromptu in G minor	pf	1838	1838	Variations on Haydn's "Emperor" hymn ("Deutschlandlied")
Op. 10	Scherzo (No. 1) in D minor	pf	1838?	1839	
Op. 11	3 Romances: 1. E♭ minor 2. G minor 3. A♭ major	pf	1839	1840	
	Piano Sonata in G minor: 1. Allegro (G minor); 2. Adagio (E♭ major); 3. Scherzo (G major); 4. Rondo finale (G minor)	pf	1841–42	1991	mvts I & III originally written in Dec.1841 as Sonatine. Allegro und Scherzo, mvts II & IV added in Jan.1842; mvt III publ. 1845 as Op. 15 No. 4
	Impromptu in E major	pf	c.1844	1885	published as No. 17 in Album du Gaulois
Op. 14	Scherzo No. 2 in C minor	pf	after 1840	1845	Uses themes from Lied Op. 12, No. 2, "Er ist gekommen in Sturm und Regen"
Op. 15	4 Flüchtige Stücke ("4 Fleeting Pieces"): 1. F major 2. A minor 3. D major 4. G major	pf	1840–44?: 4. 1841	1845	No. 4 originally part of Sonatine/Sonata
Op. 16	3 Praeludien und Fugen: 1. G minor 2. B♭ major 3. D minor	pf	by 1845	1845	
	Praeludium und Fuga a 4 voci in F♯ minor	pf	1845	2015	
	Praeludium in F minor	pf	1845		listed erroneously in some catalogs as an unpublished introduction to the "easy" Praeludien für Schüler of 1895, but was actually written 50 years earlier
	3 Fugen über Themen von J. S. Bach: 1. Fuga a 4 voci in E♭ major 2. Fuga a 4 voci in E major 3. Fuga a 4 voci in G minor	pf	1845		
Op. 20	Variationen über ein Thema von Robert Schumann in F♯ minor	pf	1853	1854	
Op. 21	3 Romanzen: 1. A minor 2. F major 3. G minor	pf	1853	1855	
WoO 28	Romanze in A minor	pf	1853	unpubl.	
	Romanze in B minor	pf	1855?	posth.	
	Geburstagmarsch ("Wedding Anniversary March") in E♭ major	pf4h	1879	unpubl.	
	(6) Praeludien	pf	c.1895	unpubl.	notated piano improvisations; listed in some catalogs as Vorspiele
	Einfach Praeludien für Schüler ("Easy Preludes for Students")	pf	1895	unpubl.	notated piano improvisations
=== Cadenza ===
	Cadenzas for Beethoven: Piano Concerto No. 4 in G major (Op. 58) Mvts 1 and 3	pf	1846		
	Cadenza for Beethoven: Piano Concerto No. 3 in C minor (Op. 37) Mvt 1	pf	1868		
	Cadenzas for Mozart: Piano Concerto No. 20 in D minor (K. 466) Mvts 1 and 3	pf	by 1891		
=== Arrangements ===
	William Sterndale Bennett: Andante cantabile, from Three Diversions (for four hands, Op. 17) (arr. C. Schumann)	pf	c.1841	2012	
	Robert Schumann: Symphony No. 1 in B♭ major (Op. 38) (arr. C. Schumann)	pf4h	c.1842–57		
	Robert Schumann: Das Paradies und die Peri (oratorio, Op. 50) (piano reduction of orchestral score by C. Schumann)	pf	c.1843–57		
	Robert Schumann: Symphony No. 2 in C major (Op. 61) (arr. C. Schumann)	pf4h	c.1846–57		
	Robert Schumann: Genoveva (opera, Op. 81) (piano reduction of orchestral score by C. Schumann)	pf	c.1848–57	1880	
	Robert Schumann: Piano Quintet in E♭ major (Op. 44) (arr. C. Schumann)	pf4h	1857		a reworking of an arrangement abandoned by Brahms
	Robert Schumann: Scenen aus Göthe's Faust (oratorio, WoO 3) (piano reduction of orchestral score by C. Schumann)	pf	1858		
	Johannes Brahms: Serenade No. 1 in D Major (for orchestra, Op. 11) Mvt 4 Menuetto I/II (arr. C. Schumann)	pf	1858 or later	2012	
	Johannes Brahms: Serenade No. 2 in A Major (for orchestra, Op. 16) (arr. C. Schumann)	pf	1859 or later	2012	
	30 mélodies de Robert Schumann (30 Lieder und Gesänge von Robert Schumann, für Clavier übertragen): 1. Widmung (Op. 25 No. 1); 2. Freisinn (Op. 25 No. 2); 3. Schöne Fremde (Op. 39 No. 6); 4. Dein Angesicht (Op. 127 No. 2); 5. Ich wand're nicht (Op. 51 No. 3); 6. Märzveilchen (Op. 40 No. 1); 7. Burg' und Burgen (Op. 24 No. 7); 8. Mondnacht (Op. 39 No. 5); 9. Er ist's (Op. 79 No. 24); 10. An den Sonnenschein (Op. 36 No. 4); 11. Mit Myrthen und Rosen (Op. 24 No. 9); 12. Die Stille (Op. 39 No. 4); 13. Geständniss (Op. 74 No. 7); 14. Der Nussbaum (Op. 25 No. 3); 15. Rose, Meer und Sonne (Op. 37 No. 9); 16. Philinen's Lied (Op. 98 No. 7); 17. Volksliedchen (Op. 51 No. 2); 18. Nichts Schöneres (Op. 36 No. 3); 19. Du bist wie eine Blume (Op. 25 No. 24); 20. Er, der Herrlichste von Allen (Op. 42 No. 2); 21. Intermezzo: Dein Bildniss (Op. 39 No. 2); 22. Dem rothen Röslein gleicht mein Lieb' (Op. 27 No. 2); 23. Der Knabe mit dem Wunderhorn (Op. 30 No. 1); 24. Die Lotosblume (Op. 25 No. 7); 25. Sehnsucht (Op. 51 No. 1); 26. Sonntags am Rhein (Op. 36 No. 1); 27. In der Fremde (Op. 39 No. 1); 28. Frühlingsnacht (Op. 39 No. 12); 29. Helft mir, ihr Schwestern (Op. 42 No. 5); 30. Ständchen (Op. 36 No. 2)	pf	1872–74	c.1874	
	(11) Lieder by Robert Schumann: 1. Schöne Wiege meiner Leiden (Op. 24, No. 5); 2. Lied der Braut (Op. 25, No. 11); 3. Lust der Sturmnacht (Op. 35, No. 1); 4. Wanderlied (Op. 35, No. 3); 5. Sehnsucht nach der Waldgegend (Op. 35, No. 5); 6. Stille Tränen (Op. 35, No. 10); 7. Frühlingsfahrt (Op. 45, No. 2); 8. Loreley (Op. 53, No. 2); 9. Die Soldatenbraut (Op. 64, No. 1); 10. Frühlingslust (Op. 125, No. 2); 11. Mädchen-Schwermut (Op. 142, No. 3)	pf	1872–74	2012	
	Robert Schumann: Etuden in kanonischer Form für Orgel oder Pedalklavier (Op. 56) (arr. C. Schumann)	pf	c.1887?		
	Robert Schumann: Skizzen für Orgel oder Pedalklavier (Op. 58) (arr. C. Schumann)	pf	c.1887?		
=== Choral ===
	Schwäne kommen gezogen (partsong)	ch	1830		lost
	Wenn ich ein Vöglein wär (3-part canon)	3v	1840		
Op. 19	3 Gemischte Chöre (partsongs) text: Geibel: 1. Abendfeyer in Venedig; 2. Vorwärts; 3. Gondoliera	ch	1848		composed for Robert Schumann's 38th birthday; intended as Op. 19 but withheld
=== Lied ===
	Alte Heimat text: Kerner	v pf	1831		lost
	Der Traum von Tiedge	v pf	1831		lost
	Der Wanderer text: Kerner	v pf	1831		authenticity doubtful
	Der Wanderer in der Sägemühle text: Kerner	v pf	1832?		authenticity doubtful
	An Alexis	v pf	1833		formerly thought to be a lost piano piece written in 1832, discovered c.1990
	Walzer text: Lyser	v pf	1834?		
	Der Abendstern	v pf	1834?		
	Am Strande text: Burns	v pf	1840		
	Ihr Bildnis text: Heine	v pf	1840		revised 1843 as Ich stand in dunklen Träumen Op. 13 No. 1
	Volkslied text: Heine	v pf	1840		
Op. 12	(3) Gedichte aus Rückerts Liebesfrühling (songs) text: Rückert: 1. Er ist gekommen in Sturm und Regen (R. Schumann's Op. 37 No. 2); 2. Liebst du um Schönheit (R. Schumann's Op. 37 No. 4); 3. Warum willst du and're fragen (R. Schumann's Op. 37 No. 11)	v pf	1840	1841	
	Die gute Nacht, die ich dir sage text: Rückert	v pf	1841	1992	
	Sie liebten sich beide text: Heine	v pf	1842	unpubl.	revised as Op. 13 No. 6
Op. 13	6 Lieder: 1. Ich stand in dunklen Träumen text: Heine; 2. Sie liebten sich beide text: Heine; 3. Liebeszauber text: Geibel; 4. Der Mond kommt still gegangen text: Geibel; 5. Ich hab' in deinem Auge text: Rückert; 6. Die stille Lotosblume text: Geibel	v pf	1840–43	1844	1. 2nd version of Ihr Bildnis; 2. 2nd version
	Lorelei text: Heine	v pf	1843	1990	
	Oh weh des Scheidens, das er tat text: Rückert	v pf	1843		
	Mein Stern text: Serre	v pf	1846		
	Beim Abschied text: Serre	v pf	1846		
Op. 23	6 Lieder aus "Jucunde" von Hermann Rollet: 1. Was weinst du, Blümlein; 2. An einem lichten Morgen; 3. Geheimes Flüstern hier und dort 4. Auf einem grünen Hügel; 5. Das ist ein Tag, der klingen mag 6. O Lust, o Lust	v pf	1853	1855	
	Das Veilchen text: Goethe	v pf	1853		

== Sources ==
- Reich, Nancy B. Clara Schumann: The Artist and the Woman, Revised edition, 2001. pp. 289-337 (Catalogue of Works). Ithaca, NY: Cornell University Press. ISBN 0801468302. OCLC 856430972
- New Grove Dictionary of Music and Musicians, 7th edition, 2001. S.v. "Schumann, Clara," by Nancy B. Reich.
- Koch, Paul-August. Clara Wieck-Schumann: (1819-1896): Kompositionen: eine Zusammenstellung der Werke, Literatur und Schallplatten. Frankfurt am Main: Zimmermann; Hofheim am Taunus: F. Hofmeister, 1991, 48 p., ML134.S339 A35. Thematic catalog and discography.
- Schumann, Clara. Sämtliche Lieder für Singstimme und Klavier: Complete Songs for Voice and Piano. Ed. by Joachim Draheim and Brigitte Höft. 2 vols. Wiesbaden: Breitkopf & Härtel, 1990.
- Reich, Nancy B.: "Clara Schumann: The Artist and the Woman". Ithaca: Cornell University Press, 1985. Original edition.
- New Grove Dictionary of Music and Musicians, 6th edition, 1980. S.v. "Schumann, Clara," by Pamela Süsskind.
