= Marie Wieck =

German pianist, singer, and composer (1832–1916)

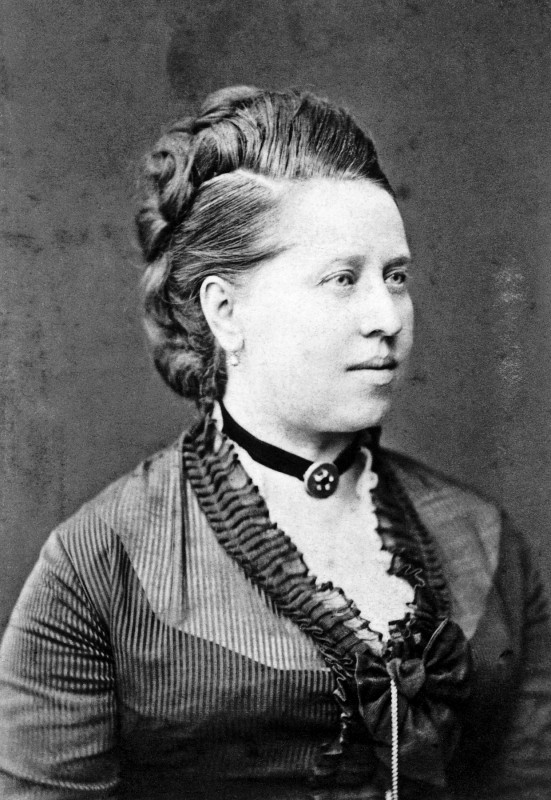
- Wieck in 1870
- Born: 17 January 1832; Leipzig, Kingdom of Saxony, German Confederation
- Died: 2 November 1916 (aged 84)
- Occupations: Pianist; Singer; Composer; Piano teacher
- Father: Friedrich Wieck
- Relatives: Clara Schumann (sister)

Marie Wieck (17 January 1832 – 2 November 1916) was a German pianist, singer, piano teacher, and composer. She was the daughter of renowned piano teacher Friedrich Wieck and the younger half-sister of Clara Schumann who was 12 years older.

== Life and career ==
Marie was born in Leipzig to Friedrich Wieck and his second wife Clementine Fechner. Her mother was a sister of painter Eduard Clemens Fechner and of experimental psychology pioneer Gustav Fechner. She was trained from an early age in piano and singing by her father, Friedrich. Marie's first public appearance was in 1842, when she and her half-sister Clara performed at a concert in Dresden. She later performed with her father at the Gewandhaus in Leipzig.

An eminent singer and pianist, Wieck sang in concerts with her half-sister Clara and also performed with Joseph Joachim's wife, the opera singer Amalie Schneeweiss. In 1857, she was appointed court pianist for the chamber concerts of the Prince of Hohenzollern.

Wieck composed and published several piano works, including Études for piano and studies for singing. She is credited for her work that brought German music to the attention of the public, particularly in London, where she performed for five seasons. Wieck never married.
