= 4 Pièces caractéristiques =

1836 series of 4 compositions by Clara Schumann

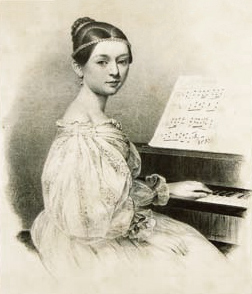
Clara Schumann, from an 1835 lithograph

4 Pièces caractéristiques by Clara Schumann was composed between 1834 and 1836, and published in 1836. The entire work is labeled as opus 5, and is written for solo piano.

This piece was performed frequently by Clara, especially during her early career. Chopin heard her perform this piece, along with her op. 6 and op. 7, and he left with a copy of the score for the op. 5, "over which he had declared himself especially enchanted and enthusiastic—and leaving a page for her album behind him. Anyone who looks at this Op. 5 more closely will easily be convinced by the lively opening and the beautiful elegiac middle movement, that Chopin's praise by no means sprang from mere gallantry."

The Pièces caractéristiques were recorded by Jozef De Beenhouwer for the Classic Produktion Osnabrück label in 2001 as part of Clara Schumann: Complete Piano Works (cpo 9997582)

== Pieces ==
The pieces are as follows.

1. Impromptu: Le Sabbat
2. Caprice à la Boléro
3. Romance
4. Scene Fantastique: Le Ballet des Revenants

The first piece is written in a time signature of 3/8. It is in A minor and the tempo marking is Allegro furioso.

The Caprice à la Boléro is written in a time signature of 3/4. It begins in E minor with a tempo marking of Presto. After the opening statement, it transitions to E major with a tempo marking of più tranquillo e dolce. The E minor theme and tempo return, and the piece concludes with an E major variation of the original E minor theme and tempo.

The third piece is written in a time signature of 3/4. It begins in B major with a tempo marking of Andante con sentimento. It transitions to D major with a tempo marking of con anima. It concludes in B minor with a tempo marking of a tempo dolente.

The final piece is written in a time signature of 4/4. It begins in B minor with a tempo marking of Allegro ma non troppo. It transitions to 2/4 with a marking of L'istesso tempo. From there, it stays in 2/4 but transitions to G major and B minor in turn. The concluding section's key signature is B minor, but the section is functionally in B major via the use of accidentals. That concluding section is marked più moderato.

== See also ==
- List of compositions by Clara Schumann
