= 4 Polonaises (Clara Schumann) =

1831 series of four works of music

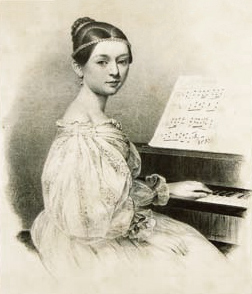
Clara Schumann, from an 1835 lithograph

Quatre Polonaises pour le pianoforte by Clara Schumann was published in 1831, and is labeled as opus 1. A work labeled as a "Polonaise" exhibits musical characteristics evoking the Polish dance form by the same (French-labeled) name. A 3/4 time signature setting is primary among these musical characteristics, and these four pieces by Clara Schumann are all in 3/4. No tempo indications are given on the score for the first three pieces. All of the pieces are in ternary form, with the middle section of each labeled as a "Trio."

- Polonaise 1 begins and ends in E♭ major. The middle Trio section is in A♭ major and is marked "delicato."
- Polonaise 2 begins and ends in C major. The middle Trio section is in F major and is marked "con delicatezza."
- Polonaise 3 begins and ends in D major and is expressively marked "risoluto." The key signature of the middle Trio section is overtly either F major or D minor. However, the use of chromatic tones obscures the tonic. This middle section is marked "espressivo."
- Polonaise 4 begins and ends in C major and is expressively marked "risoluto". The tempo indication is 92 quarter notes to the minute, and the tempo marking is "Moderato." The middle Trio section is in A minor. The tempo indication is 120 quarter notes to the minute, and the tempo marking is "Vivace."

The Quatre Polonaises were recorded by Jozef De Beenhouwer for the Classic Produktion Osnabrück label in 2001 as part of Clara Schumann: Complete Piano Works (cpo 9997582). Also Italian pianist Angela Tirino recorded these polonaises for the 2022 album The Young Clara: Piano Works (Urania).

== See also ==
- List of compositions by Clara Schumann
