= Friedrich Wieck =

German musician and author (1785–1873)

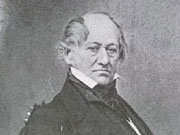
- Friedrich Wieck, c. 1838
- Born: Johann Gottlob Friedrich Wieck; August 18, 1785; Pretzsch, Electorate of Saxony, Holy Roman Empire
- Died: October 6, 1873 (aged 88); Loschwitz, Kingdom of Saxony, German Empire
- Resting place: Trinitatis Cemetery, Dresden, Germany
- Education: University of Wittenberg
- Occupations: Piano teacher, music educator, composer, music critic, piano dealer, music publisher
- Years active: c. 1815–1873
- Known for: Piano pedagogy; training of Clara Schumann and other notable pianists
- Spouses: Mariane Tromlitz (m. 1816; div. 1825); Clementine Fechner (m. 1828)
- Children: Clara Schumann; Alwin Wieck; Gustav Wieck; Marie Wieck
- Relatives: Woldemar Bargiel (stepson)

Johann Gottlob Friedrich Wieck (18 August 1785 – 6 October 1873) was a noted German piano teacher, voice teacher, owner of a piano store, and author of essays and music reviews. He is remembered as the teacher of his daughter, Clara, a child prodigy who was undertaking international concert tours by age eleven and who later married her father's pupil Robert Schumann, over her father's strenuous objection. As Clara Schumann, she became one of the most famous pianists of her time. Another of Wieck's daughters, Marie Wieck, also had a career in music, although not nearly so illustrious as Clara's. Other pupils included Hans von Bülow.

== Life ==
Wieck was born in Pretzsch, not far from Leipzig, in 1785, the son of a not very successful merchant. Although the family was not musical, Wieck was deeply interested in music and attended the Thomas-Schule in Leipzig in 1798; however, because of illness, his stay lasted only six weeks and he was forced to return home. In 1800 he attended the Torgau gymnasium, where he received his only formal training in piano, six hours of lessons from Johann Peter Milchmeyer. He had little exposure to the wider world of music and he later developed his pedagogical theories by reading Jean-Jacques Rousseau and Johann Heinrich Pestalozzi.

He studied theology at the University of Wittenberg in preparation for the ministry, matriculating in 1803, and, having preached the obligatory trial sermon in Dresden, he left theology. The following nine years he worked as a private tutor to various wealthy families in Thuringia. He became a friend of a music teacher, Adolph Bargiel, at his first position with a Baron von Seckendorff in Querfurth, and in 1815 he composed a group of songs which he sent to Carl Maria von Weber. The songs were published and reviewed in the Allgemeine musikalische Zeitung. Spurred on by a favorable comment (also including harsh criticism) from Weber, he left his position as a tutor and established himself in Leipzig as a piano teacher and in the business of renting and selling pianos and other musical instruments and keeping a music lending library, which Richard Wagner was known to use.

Marriage was considered by Wieck as a means to improve his status, which he did in 1816 by marrying Mariane Tromlitz. Tromlitz was a famous singer in Leipzig at the time. She taught the more advanced piano students of Wieck. As an accomplished singer, Marianne Tromlitz sang at the well-known Gewandhaus in Leipzig on a weekly basis.

== A prodigy's father ==
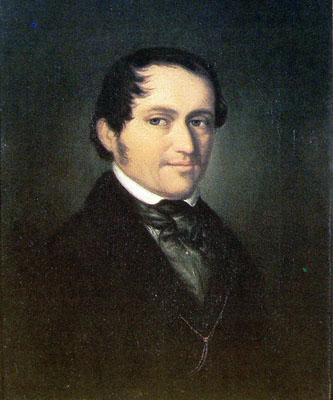
Wieck, aged 45, in the year he met Robert Schumann for the first time

He did everything to be known as father of a child prodigy, a piano virtuoso. Clara Schumann was his second born and her musical education was planned down to the smallest detail. She daily received one-hour lesson (in piano, violin, singing, theory, harmony, composition, and counterpoint), and two hours of practice, using the teaching methods he had developed on his own. He accompanied her on the tours throughout Europe. His wife gave birth to another two children, Alwyn and Gustav. The differences between Wieck and his wife, Marianne, were irreconcilable in large part due to Wieck's unyielding nature. When his friend Adolph Bargiel, father of Woldemar Bargiel, had an affair with her, she divorced Wieck in 1824. She then married Adolph Bargiel.

His second wife, Clementine Fechner – whom he married in 1828 – was twenty years his junior. Clementine was the sister of painter Eduard Clemens Fechner and of experimental psychology pioneer Gustav Fechner. One of the three children she gave birth to, besides Cäcilie and Clemens (1829–1833), who died at the age of four, Marie Wieck was also a concert pianist, although she was not as famous as was his first-born daughter. In 1844, he moved to Dresden, where he lived for the rest of his life, spending the summers at Loschwitz, where he died in 1873.

== Teaching career ==
His home was a meeting place for his piano students and other musicians. Not only his wife, his children, and his close friends, but also his business associates were affected by his drive to success. Felix Mendelssohn supported his becoming professor of piano at the Leipzig Conservatory, although the post went to Ignaz Moscheles.

His methods appear progressive, flexible, nuanced, emphasizing the individuality of the student and leading the student on by means of the enjoyment of music-making rather than harsh discipline and drills. For him, mere finger dexterity was not the focus, and he did not advocate monotonous, mechanical exercises. He emphasized evenness of tone, a beautiful, song-like legato, and expressiveness. While including finger-stretching exercises to increase the student's span, he was careful to avoid fatigue by limiting the number of hours of practice per day and insisting on long walks and fresh air. Overall musical development was essential, achieved by lessons in theory, counterpoint and composition, and regular exposure to the best possible musical performances.

In practice, however, he might not always have lived up to the ideals he described in the book Piano and Song: How to Teach, How To Learn, and How to Form a Judgment of Musical Performances. When Robert Schumann was living and studying in the Wieck household, he reported seeing Wieck punishing his nine-year-old son, Alwyn, for playing the violin poorly, tearing at his hair and yelling, "You wretch, you scoundrel, is this the way you try to please your father?" Clara seemed unconcerned at the violent scene. Shocked, Schumann wrote in his diary, "Am I among human beings?" Besides the book he published some studies and exercises for the piano, a number of pamphlets and substantial essays, and edited various piano works.

== Opposing his daughter's marriage with Robert Schumann ==
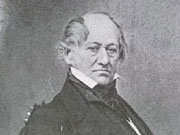
Friedrich Wieck in later life

A turning point came in Wieck's life when Clara and Robert Schumann fell in love.

Fearing that her marriage to an impecunious composer would destroy the plans he had for her music career, he opposed their union in every way he could. He threatened to shoot Robert. The young lovers resorted to clandestine meetings and letter-writing. Because Clara was not yet of age, her father's consent was required before they could marry. Not receiving his consent, they applied to the Saxon Court of Appeals for permission to be married without his consent. Wieck threatened that if Clara did not give up Robert, he would disinherit her, deprive her even of the money she had earned herself and tie the pair up in legal proceedings for 3–5 years. On July 2, 1839 Schumann's attorney tried to negotiate with Wieck but was unsuccessful.

On July 16 Schumann filed a complaint against Wieck. The court scheduled a meeting for Wieck, Clara and Robert but when the day came Wieck did not appear, pleading that he was too busy. He then offered to settle with the court, setting highly demanding terms: he would allow Clara to marry provided that Clara give all her seven years of concert earnings to her brothers and pay 1000 thalers in order to retrieve her piano and personal belongings from the Wieck home; he demanded that Robert set aside 8000 thalers to be invested so that the interest would compensate Clara if the marriage failed.

The court rejected his highly demanding terms. Wieck asked for another conference with the court, which was set for October 2, but again Wieck failed to appear. The conference was rescheduled for December 18. Four days before the conference date, Wieck filed another appeal, an ugly, defamatory "declaration" to court objecting to the marriage, accusing Schumann of a litany of weaknesses and vices, especially habitual drunkenness and the inability to support a wife. Schumann "cannot speak coherently or write legibly," he is "lazy, unreliable, and conceited," "a mediocre composer whose music is unclear and almost impossible to perform," "incompetent, childish, unmanly, in short totally lost for any social adjustment." Some of the information he used was obtained by breaking into Clara's locked letter-box. The court did not issue a judgment for several months.

Wieck took to spreading vicious rumours against the couple. He sent copies of his court documents to every city where Clara was planning to give concerts. When she traveled to Hamburg and Berlin to perform, he sent letters claiming that Clara's playing had declined. Striking an emotional blow against Clara, he began to promote the career of a rival female pianist, Camilla Pleyel.

In July 1840, the court ruled against Wieck, and it gave consent to the marriage. Schumann then sued Wieck for slander and won. Wieck was forced to pay the couple a large sum, and he was sentenced to jail for 18 days for unruly courtroom behaviour, although it is not clear whether he actually served the sentence.

Clara and Robert married on September 12, 1840, the day before her twenty-first birthday. For several months Wieck refused to release to Clara the piano from the Wieck home on which she had played since childhood; finally he was forced to do so by court order. By 1843 Wieck was a grandfather, Clara having given birth to the first two of her eight children, and Schumann was winning a growing reputation as a serious composer.

Wieck invited Schumann to a reconciliation, writing, "For Clara's sake and the world's, we can no longer keep each other at a distance. You too are now a family man – is a longer explanation needed?". The reconciliation was welcomed by Clara, although Robert was less enthusiastic. However, Schumann must have enjoyed the way Wieck treated him in his essays from 1844 on: as a first-grade model for art, beside Frederic Chopin, Felix Mendelssohn and Ignaz Moscheles. In 1844 Wieck was again involved in managing Clara's career, but by March 1850 he was promoting the musical career not of Clara but of her sister, Marie, as well as the singer Minna "Schulz-Wieck", whom he falsely advertised as his daughter.

== Chopin ==
Wieck published a very positive review of Frédéric Chopin's Variations on "La ci darem la mano" in the German periodical, Caecilia. Chopin found the review so embarrassingly gushing that he blocked Wieck's attempts to have the review published in French. In a letter to a friend, Chopin wrote that Wieck, "instead of being clever, is very stupid" and that he did not want his musical integrity to "die" because of "the imagination of that ... stubborn German."
