= Piano Concerto (Clara Schumann) =

Musical composition by Clara Schumann

- by Clara Schumann
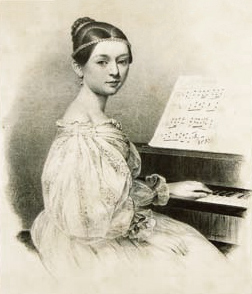
- The composer, Clara Wieck, in 1835
- Key: A minor
- Opus: 7
- Period: Romantic
- Composed: 1834–35
- Movements: 3

Premiere
- Date: 9 November 1835
- Location: Leipzig

The Piano Concerto in A minor, Op. 7, was composed by Clara Wieck, better known as Clara Schumann after her later marriage to Robert Schumann. She completed her only finished piano concerto in 1835, and played it first that year with the Leipzig Gewandhaus Orchestra, conducted by Felix Mendelssohn.

== History ==
Clara Wieck was an accomplished concert pianist, trained by her father Friedrich Wieck. She was already making international tours at age eleven and composed piano pieces for her recitals. In January 1833, at age 13, she began composing a Piano Concerto in A minor, completing in November a single-movement Konzertsatz that she orchestrated herself. In February 1834, her future husband Robert revised the orchestration, and the 14-year-old prodigy then performed it in several concerts.

She then expanded the work by adding two more movements, using the Konzertsatz as the finale. The new first movement was completed in June 1834, and the slow second movement "Romance" with its extended cello solo was finished the following year. She again orchestrated the work herself, including undoing Robert's revisions of the original Konzertsatz, completing her new three-movement Piano Concerto on 1 September 1835, twelve days before her 16th birthday.

Wieck premiered the full concerto on 9 November 1835 as soloist with the Leipzig Gewandhaus Orchestra, conducted by Mendelssohn.

== Music ==
The concerto is scored for piano solo, 2 flutes, 2 oboes, 2 clarinets in A, 2 bassoons, 2 horns in A, 2 trumpets in C, trombone, timpani in A & E, violins I & II, violas, cellos, and basses. With this instrumentation, Clara Schumann chose the usual orchestration typical of early Romantic music.

The concerto is in three movements:

1. Allegro maestoso (A minor)
2. Romanze: Andante non troppo con grazia (A♭ major)
3. Finale: Allegro non troppo – Allegro molto (A minor)

The duration of the concerto is under 20 minutes. Virtuoso writing for the piano dominates the composition. A reviewer of a 2004 recording noted that it is a "truly remarkable piece for a 14 year old. It is a work with memorable themes and a sunny vision throughout". It has been favourably compared to Chopin's piano concertos.

The opening movement begins dramatically, with the piano entering in a virtuosic manner. The first movement is in "half sonata form", where after an exposition which shifts into the dominant key of E major, instead of continuing on into a development section segues into the second movement, called a "Romance" written for piano and cello, without orchestra. It begins with an extended solo piano passage, then the solo cello enters. At the end, a timpani drum roll segues into the final movement. This movement is the most substantial, accounting for almost half of the length of the whole concerto, dancing in a triple metre. The woodwinds and the piano enter with counterpoint.

== Recordings ==
The piano concerto was recorded in 2000 in the Neuberinhaus, Reichenbach, Vogtland, Germany, by Elena Margolina, piano soloist, with the Vogtland Philharmonie conducted by Doron Salomon (ARS SACD ARS38141, with the composer's 2nd Konzertsatz in F minor, written in 1847 and not published until 1994, and Robert Schumann's Konzertsatz in D minor, written in 1839, two years before his A minor concerto).

Another recording was made in 2004 in the church Santi Marcellino e Festo in Naples, Italy, by pianist Francesco Nicolosi with the Alma Mahler Sinfonietta, Stefania Rinaldi conducting (this recording is 23 mins 21 secs) (Naxos CD 8.557552, with the composer's Piano Trio in G minor, Op. 17 from 1846).

In 2020, the Venezuelan-American pianist Gabriela Montero recorded the concerto together with Canada's National Arts Centre Orchestra conducted by Alexander Shelley as part of the first volume in the series Clara, Robert, Johannes.
