= Janusz Bargieł =

Polish politician (1958–2021)

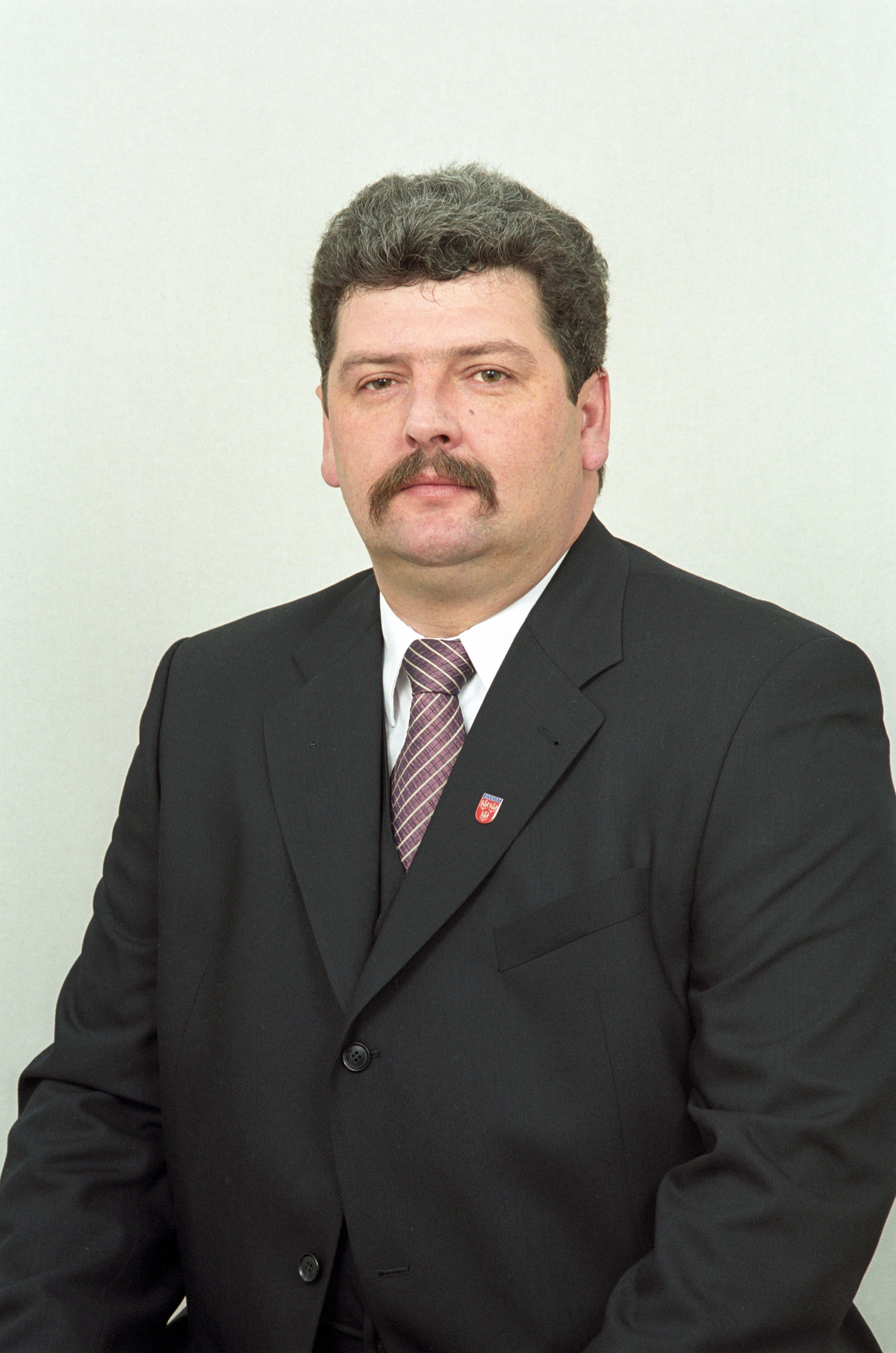
- Bargieł in 2005

Member of the Senate of Poland
- In office 20 October 2001 – 18 October 2005
- Constituency: District 12

Personal details
- Born: 15 May 1958; Olkusz, Poland
- Died: 11 December 2021 (aged 63)
- Political party: SLD

Janusz Lucjan Bargieł (15 May 1958 – 11 December 2021) was a Polish politician. A member of the Democratic Left Alliance, he served in the Senate of Poland from 2001 to 2005.
