= Gedächtniskirche Schönefeld =

Coordinates: 51°21′34.″N 12°24′32.6″E

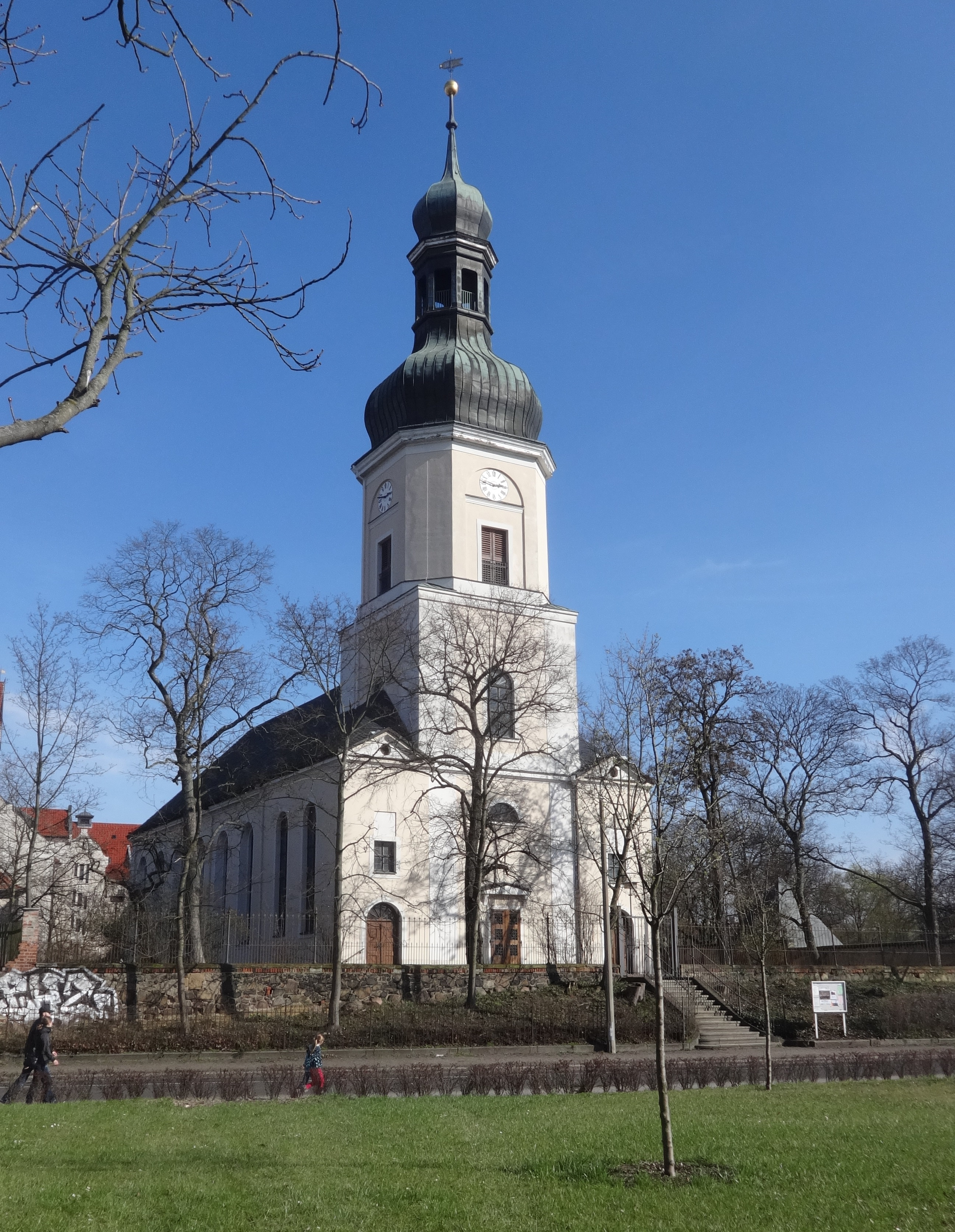
The church in 2017

Gedächtniskirche Schönefeld (Schönefeld Memorial Church) is a Lutheran church in Schönefeld, now part of Leipzig, Saxony, Germany. The former village church was built in style from 1816, replacing a previous building destroyed by fire. It was named Gedächtniskirche in 1916 when it became a memorial to fallen soldiers.

== History ==
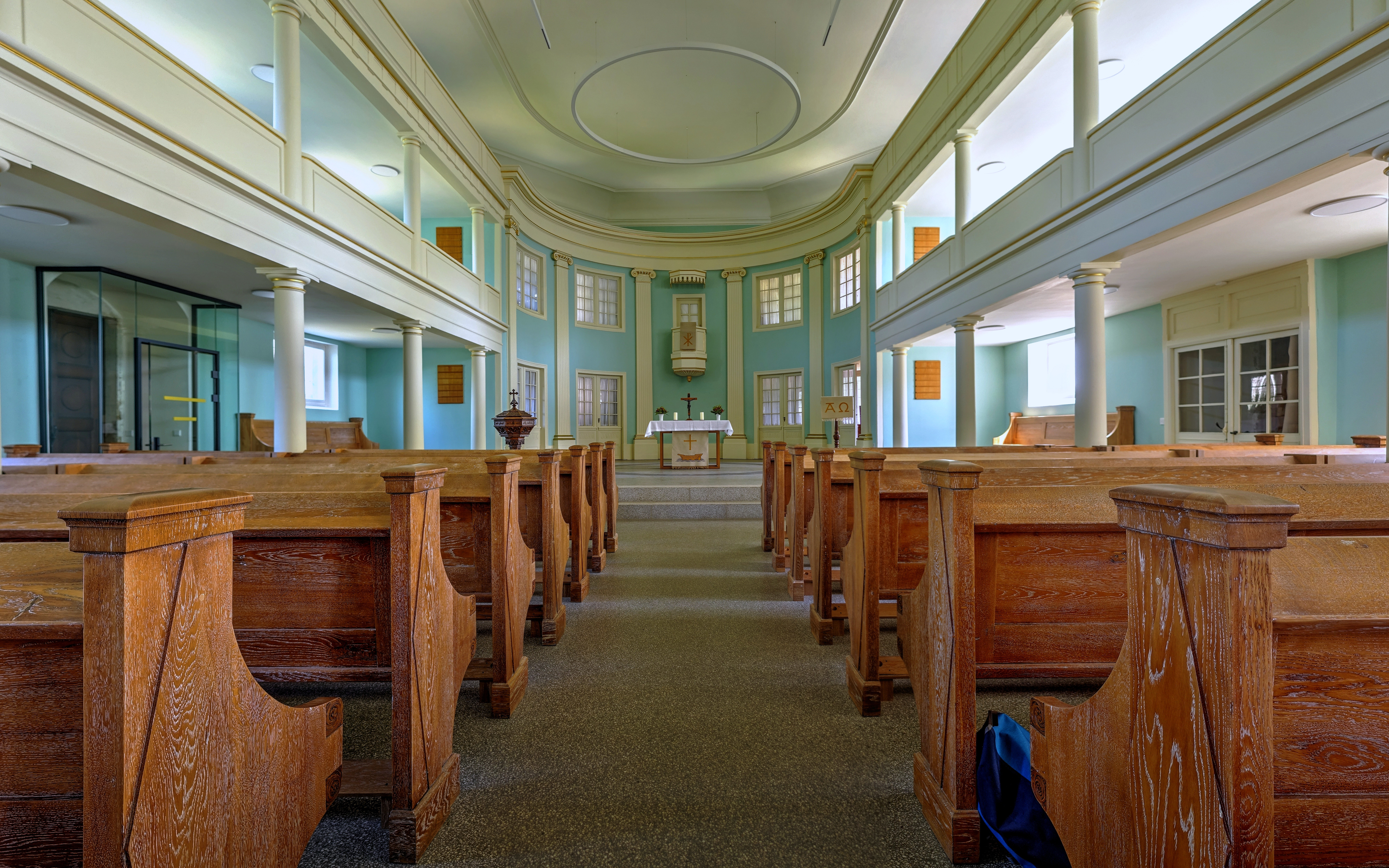
Interior facing the altar

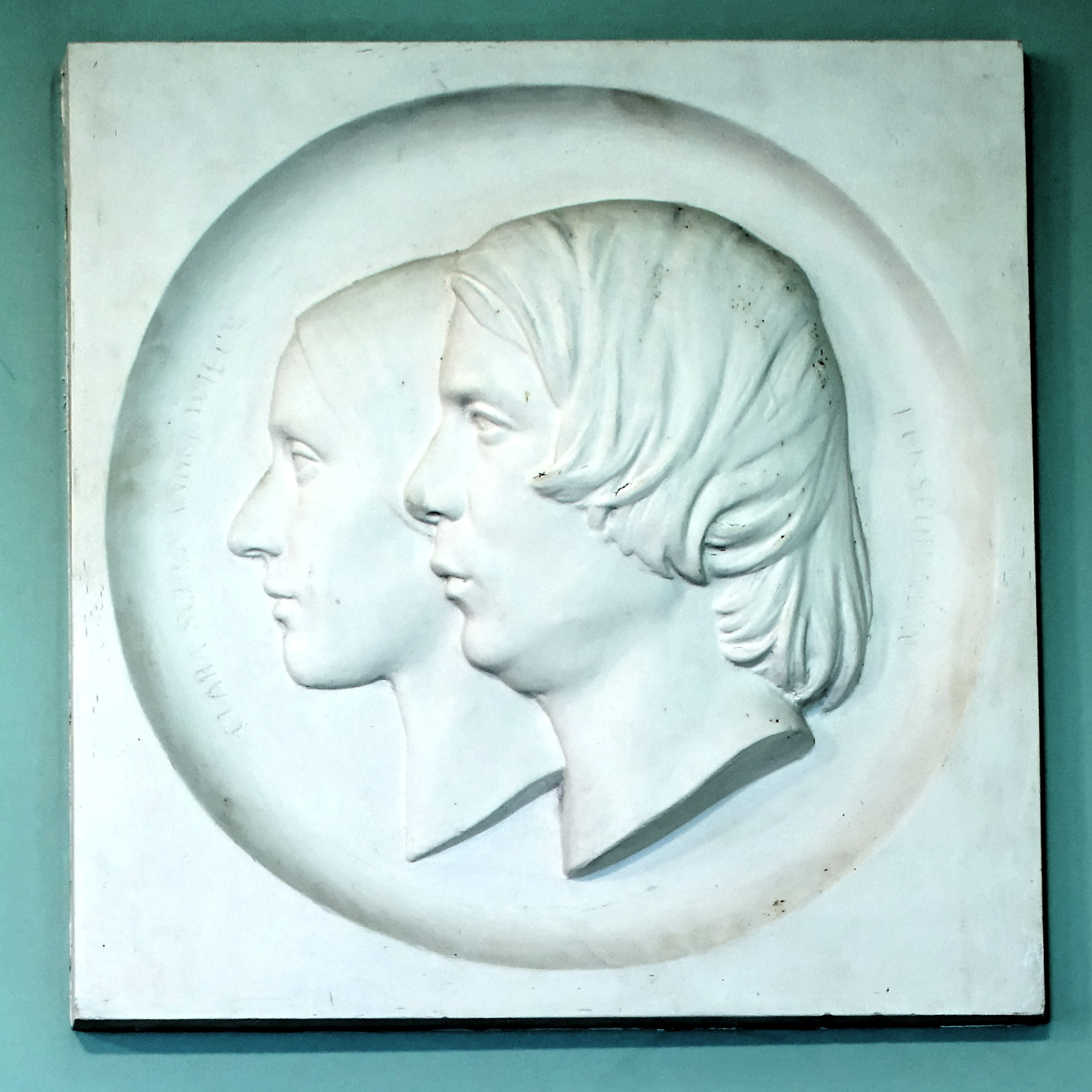
Relief in memory of the wedding of Clara und Robert Schumann (1840)

The first church in Schönefeld was probably built in the early 14th century. It burned down in 1526, and was restored within a year. It was rebuilt and expanded from 1753 to 1776. On 18 October 1813, it was destroyed by fire during the Battle of Leipzig.

In 1816, a new church was begun, by the Leipzig master carpenter Walter Friedrich and the Schönefeld master mason Carl Friedrich. From 1817, mason Wagner from Leipzig and Adam Gottlob Lindner from Seegeritz helped. The church was inaugurated on 16 April 1820; the tower was completed end of that year, and the bells were consecrated on 25 August 1839. Interior features were provided by 27 sponsors from Leipzig, mostly merchants, including a marble altar (no longer extant) and silver chandeliers and communion sets.

Clara and Robert Schumann were married at the church on 12 September 1840. Hedwig von Eberstein donated a baptism table made in Jerusalem from olive tree wood, with a silver bowl, in 1870. In 1869 a steam heating and gas lighting were installed, and the chancel was moved from the centre to the south side, replaced by a high Cross. Gustav Jäger painted a cycle of four paintings, of Moses and Abraham, David with four prophets, the Four Evangelists, and Christ the King. A restoration in 1915/16, supervised by architect Fritz Drechsler included an expansion of the organ balcony, with new staircases leading to it; the entrance hall was transformed to a memorial to soldiers fallen in the Franco-Prussian War and the World War. It was reopened on 19 March 1916, now named Gedächtniskirche.

In 2017 the parish invested in cleaning and tuning the Eule organ, installing a ramp for handicapped visitors, restoring the interior to the original colour plan, and modernising the lighting and heating to comply with current standards. The plans were realised from 2010 and completed in 2021.
