= Woldemar Bargiel =

German composer (1828–1897)

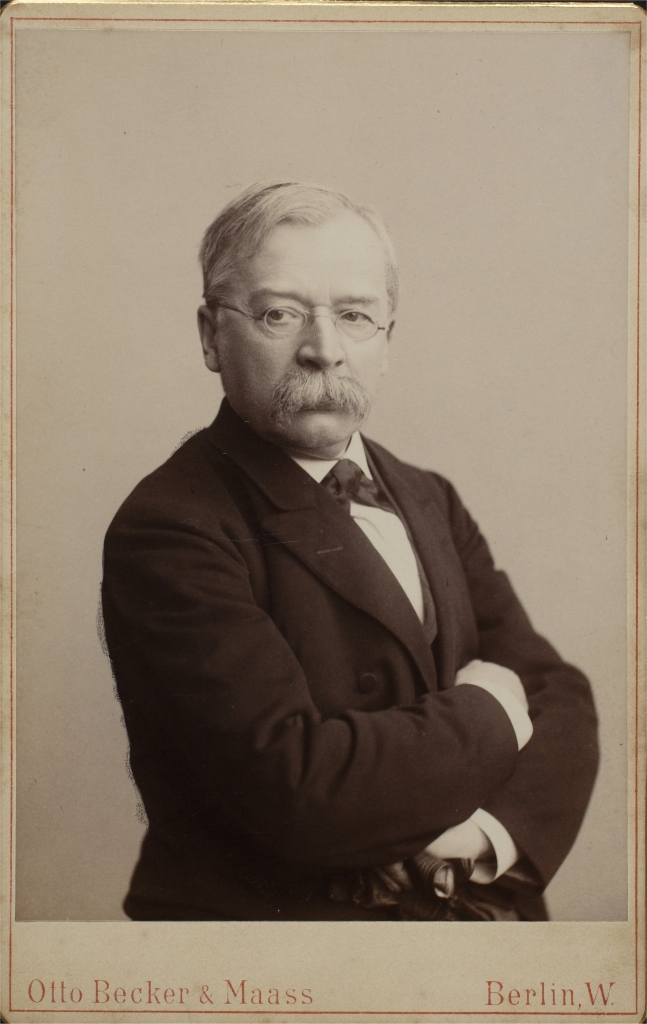
- Bargiel in 1885
- Born: 3 October 1828; Berlin
- Died: 20 May 1897 (aged 68)
- Education: Leipzig Conservatory
- Occupations: Composer; conductor; academic teacher
- Organization: Hochschule fur Musik in Berlin
- Mother: Mariane Bargiel

Woldemar Bargiel (3 October 1828 – 23 February 1897) was a German composer and conductor of the Romantic period.

== Life ==
Bargiel was born in Berlin and was the younger maternal half-brother of Clara Schumann. Bargiel’s father Adolph was a well-known piano and voice teacher while his mother Mariane Tromlitz, a granddaughter of the famous flautist Johann Georg Tromlitz, had previously been unhappily married to Clara’s father, Friedrich Wieck. Clara was nine years older than Woldemar. Throughout their lives, they enjoyed a warm relationship. The initial opportunities which led to the success and recognition he enjoyed were due to Clara, who introduced him to both Robert Schumann and Felix Mendelssohn. Bargiel received his first lessons at home and later with the well-known Berlin teacher of music theory Siegfried Wilhelm Dehn. Upon the suggestion of Schumann and the recommendation of Mendelssohn, Bargiel at age 18 went to study at the famous Leipzig Conservatory with some of the leading scholars of music: Ignaz Moscheles (piano) and Niels Gade (composition), and also with Julius Rietz.

After leaving Leipzig in 1850, he returned to Berlin where he tried to make ends meet by giving private lessons. Eventually, Clara and Robert were able to arrange for the publication of some of his early works, including his First Piano Trio.

Subsequently, Bargiel held positions at the conservatories in Cologne and Rotterdam (where he met Hermine Tours, his future wife, sister of the composer Berthold Tours) before accepting a position at the prestigious Hochschule fur Musik in Berlin where he taught for the rest of his life. Among his many students were Paul Juon, Waldemar von Baußnern, Alexander Ilyinsky, Agnes Tschetschulin, and Leopold Godowsky. Besides teaching and composing, Bargiel served with Brahms as co-editor of the complete editions of Schumann's and Chopin's works. While Bargiel did not write a lot of music, most of what he composed was well thought out and shows solid musical craftsmanship. His chamber music—he wrote four string quartets, a string octet and three piano trios—represents an important part of his output.

== Selected list of compositions ==
- W/o Opus- String Quartet No.1 in E major(1848)
- W/o Opus- String Quartet No.2 in D minor(1848–50)
- Op. 1 3 Character pieces for piano (1848–1850)
- Op. 2 Character pieces for piano (1850)
- Op. 3 Three nocturnes for piano (1849–51)
- Op. 4 Six bagatelles for piano (1851)
- Op. 6 Piano trio No. 1 in F major (1851)
- Op. 7 Suite for piano, four hands (1853)
- Op. 8 Three character pieces for piano (1853)
- Op. 9 Three fantasy-pieces for piano (1853–54)
- Op. 10 Violin Sonata in F minor (1854)
- Op. 13 Scherzo for piano (1857)
- Op.15 Fantasy Piece for Piano (1856)
- Op. 15a Octet for strings in C minor (I.Adagio - Allegro appassionato; II.Andante sostenuto - Allegro - Tempo 1 - Tempo 2; III. Allegro) (1849–50, published 1877)
- Op. 15b String Quartet No. 3 in A minor (by April 16, 1851)
- Op. 16 Overture to Prometheus (1852, revised 1854 and 1859)
- Op. 17 Suite for violin and piano (1858)
- Op. 18 Overture to a Tragedy (1856)
- Op. 19 Third Fantasy for solo piano (1858, published 1860)
- Op. 20 Piano Trio No. 2 in E♭ (1857, published 1860)
- Op. 21 Suite for piano (I. Praludium; II. Zwiegesang; III. Sarabande; IV. Marsch - Trio; V. Scherzo; VI. Finale) (1860)
- Op. 22 Overture to Medea (1861)
- Op. 23 Sonata for piano in G, four hands (1862)
- Op. 25 Psalm 13 (for chorus and orchestra) (1862)
- Op. 26 Psalm 23 (1862)
- Op. 29 Gigue for piano four-hands (1853?)
- Op. 30 Symphony in C major (1864)
- Op. 31 Suite in G minor for piano (I. Prelude; II. Elegy; III. Marcia fantastica; IV. Scherzo; V.Adagio; VI.Finale) (1864)
- Op. 32 Eight fantasy pieces for piano (published 1866)
- Op. 33 Psalm 96 for unaccompanied double chorus (published 1867)
- Op. 34 Sonata for piano in C (I. Allegro moderato, con passione; II. Andante, un poco con moto; III. Adagio maestoso - Allegro molto - Prestissimo) (1867)
- Op. 35 Three Spring Songs, for three-part women's chorus (1867)
- Op. 37 Piano Trio No. 3 in B♭ (published 1870)
- Op. 38 Adagio in G major for violin or cello and piano or orchestra (1871)
- Op. 39 Spring Songs (for three-part chorus with piano) (published 1872)
- Op. 41 Eight Piano Pieces (published 1873)
- Op. 43 Psalm 61 (for choir, baritone solo and orchestra) (published 1878)
- Op. 44 Impromptus, for piano (1869?, published 1880)
- Op. 45 Etude and Toccata for piano (published 1880)
- Op. 47 String Quartet No. 4 in D minor (published 1888)
- Op. 48 Intermezzo for orchestra (arrangement of the slow movement of the Op. 34 piano sonata) (also published as Op. 46)

== References and sources ==
- Some of the information on this page appears on the website of Edition Silvertrust but permission has been granted to copy, distribute and/or modify this document under the terms of the GNU Free Documentation License.
- Upton, George Putnam (1888). The Standard Symphonies: Their History, Their Music, and Their Composers; a Handbook. Chicago: A. C. McClurg and company. p. 311. OCLC 419156.
- Schytte, Henrick Vissing (1888–92). Nordisk musik-lexikon (in Danish). Copenhagen: Wilhelm Hansen, Musik-forl. p. 49. OCLC 186788569.
