= Mariane Bargiel =

German pianist, soprano and piano teacher (1797–1872)

- Born: Mariane Tromlitz; 17 May 1797; Greiz
- Died: 10 March 1872 (aged 74); Berlin, German Empire
- Other names: Mariane Wieck
- Occupations: Pianist; Soprano; Piano teacher
- Spouses: Friedrich Wieck (m. 1816; div. 1825) Adolph Bargiel (m. 1825; died 1841)
- Children: 9 (including Clara Schumann, Woldemar Bargiel and Alwin Wieck)
- Parent(s): George Christian Gotthold Tromlitz; Christiana Friederica Carl
- Relatives: Johann George Tromlitz (grandfather); Eugenie Schumann (granddaughter)

Mariane Bargiel (née Tromlitz, formerly Wieck; 17 May 1797 – 10 March 1872) was a German pianist, soprano and piano teacher. She was the mother of Clara Schumann.

== Life ==
Born Mariane Tromlitz in Greiz, she was the first child of George Christian Gotthold Tromlitz (1765–1825), a church musician, music teacher and composer, and his wife Christiana Friederica (née Carl) (1766–1830). Her given name is often reported as Marianne. Her siblings were Georg Wilhelm (1799–1801) and Emilie (1802–1885). Her grandfather was the notable flutist and flute builder Johann George Tromlitz. She received first musical training from her father, and then studied with Friedrich Wieck. In her first public concert at age 15 at the Gesellschaftshaus (society hall) in Plauen, she played the piano quartet by Anton Eberl.

On 23 June 1816, she married her teacher Friedrich Wieck in Oberlosa, Vogtland. The lived in Leipzig. During the first years, she appeared successfully as a pianist and singer, and worked as a piano teacher. The couple had five children, Adelheid (1817–1818), Clara Josephine (1819–1896), Friedrich Alwin Feodor (1821-1885), Gustav (1823–1884) and Victor (1824–1826).

She left her husband on 12 May 1824, and first returned to her parents, with Clara, then age 4 1/2, and Victor, a baby of three months. They were divorced on 22 January 1825. As the father customarily held custody of the children, Clara could stay with her mother only until age five, and lived from 17 September 1824 with her father in Leipzig.

Tromlitz married Adolph Bargiel, a piano and voice teacher, in August 1825, and they moved to Berlin in 1826. He became director of a musical academy there, founded by Johann Bernhard Logier, where she also taught. The couple had four children, Woldemar (1828-1897), Eugen (1830–1907), Cäcilie (1832–1910) and Clementine (1835–1869). Bargiel is listed as a soprano of the Berliner Singakademie from 1827, as a soloist from 1829. The academy had to be closed in 1830. In 1836, Adolph Bargiel suffered a stroke and died after long illness in 1841.

Bargiel joined Stern'scher Gesangverein as a choir member and soloist, and worked as a piano teacher. She died at age 74 in Berlin on 10 March 1872.
