= Clara Schumann =

German pianist and composer (1819–1896)

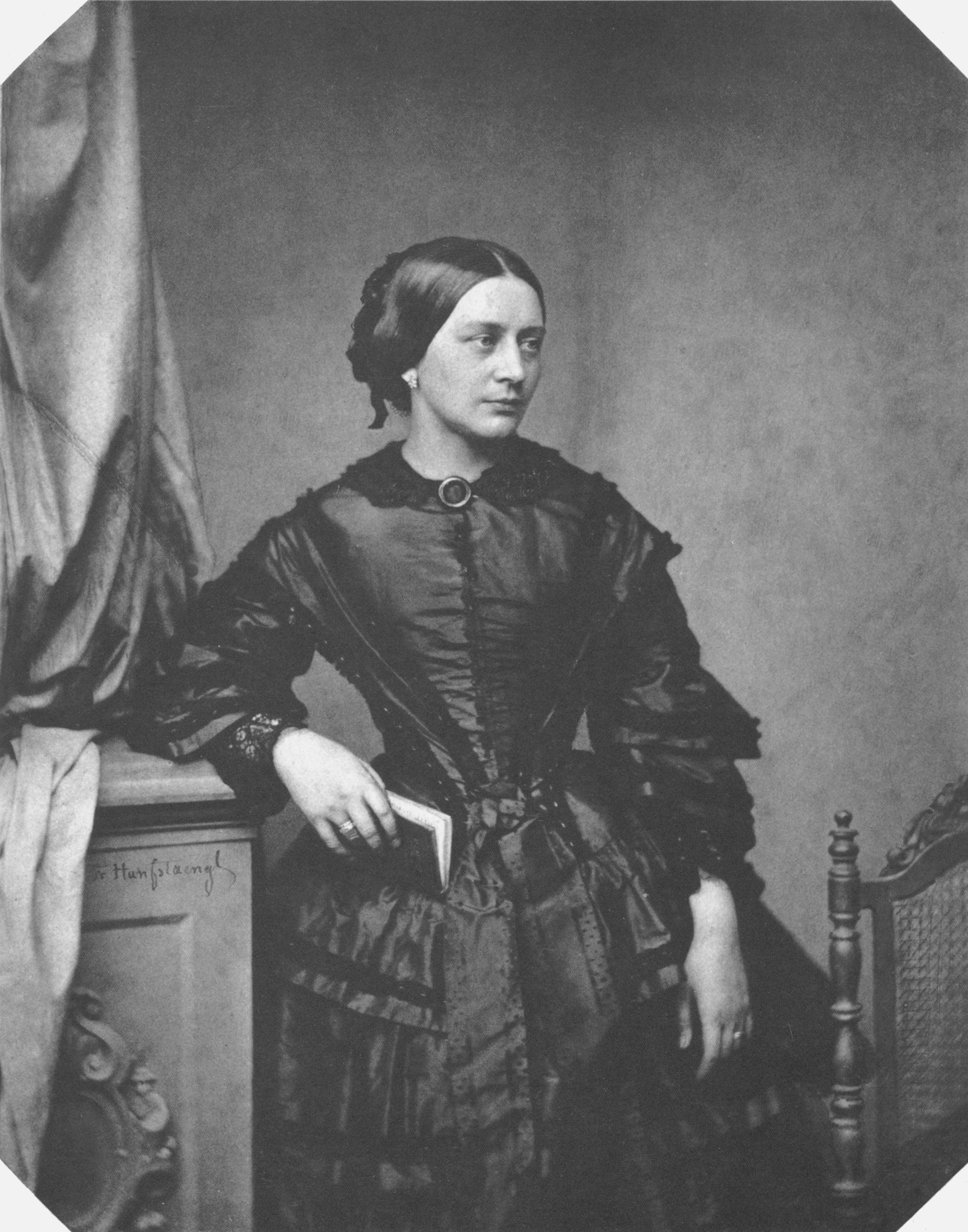
- Portrait by Franz Hanfstaengl, 1857
- Born: Clara Josephine Wieck; 13 September 1819; Leipzig, Kingdom of Saxony, German Confederation
- Died: 20 May 1896 (aged 76); Frankfurt, German Empire
- Occupations: Pianist; Composer; Piano teacher
- Organization: Dr. Hoch's Konservatorium
- Spouse: Robert Schumann (m. 1840; died 1856)
- Children: 8, including Eugenie
- Parents: Friedrich Wieck (father); Mariane Bargiel (mother)

Clara Josephine Schumann (/ˈʃuːmɑːn/; German: [ˈklaːʁa jozəˈfiːnə ˈʃuːman]; née Wieck; 13 September 1819 – 20 May 1896) was a German virtuoso pianist, composer, and piano teacher. Regarded as one of the most distinguished pianists of the Romantic era, she exerted her influence over the course of a 61-year concert career, changing the format and repertoire of the piano recital by lessening the importance of purely virtuosic works. She also composed solo piano pieces, a piano concerto, chamber music, choral pieces, and songs.

She grew up in Leipzig. She was a child prodigy, first trained by her mother Mariane Wieck, then by her father Friedrich Wieck. She began touring at age eleven, and was successful in Paris and Vienna, among other cities. She married the composer Robert Schumann, on 12 September 1840, and the couple had eight children. Together, they encouraged Johannes Brahms and maintained a close relationship with him. She gave the public premieres of many works by her husband and by Brahms. After Robert Schumann's early death, she continued her concert tours in Europe for decades, frequently with the violinist Joseph Joachim and other chamber musicians. Beginning in 1878, she was an influential piano educator at Dr. Hoch's Konservatorium in Frankfurt, where she attracted international students. She also edited the publication of her husband's work.

Several films have focused on Schumann's life, the earliest being Träumerei (Dreaming) of 1944. A 2008 film, Geliebte Clara (Beloved Clara), was directed by Helma Sanders-Brahms. An image of Clara Schumann from an 1835 lithograph by Andreas Staub was featured on the 100 Deutsche Mark banknote from 1989 to 2002. Interest in her compositions began to revive in the late 20th century, and her 2019 bicentenary prompted new books and exhibitions.

== Life ==
=== Early life ===
==== Family ====
Clara Josephine Wieck [ˈklaːʀa jozəˈfiːnə ˈviːk] was born in Leipzig on 13 September 1819 to Friedrich Wieck and his wife Mariane (née Tromlitz). Her mother was a famous singer in Leipzig who performed weekly piano and soprano solos at the Gewandhaus. Clara's parents had irreconcilable differences, in part due to her father's unyielding nature. Prompted by an affair between her mother and Adolph Bargiel, her father's friend, the Wiecks were divorced in 1825, with Mariane later marrying Bargiel. Five-year-old Clara remained with her father while Mariane and Bargiel eventually moved to Berlin, limiting contact between Clara and her mother to written letters and occasional visits.

==== Child prodigy ====
From an early age, Clara's father planned her career and life down to the smallest detail. She started receiving basic piano instruction from her mother at the age of four. After her mother moved out, she began taking daily one-hour lessons from her father. They included subjects such as piano, violin, singing, theory, harmony, composition, and counterpoint. She then had to practice for two hours every day. Her father followed the methods in his own book, Wiecks pianistische Erziehung zum schönen Anschlag und zum singenden Ton ("Wieck's Piano Education for a Delicate Touch and a Singing Sound.") Her musical studies came largely at the expense of her broader general education, although she still studied religion and languages under her father's control of the family.

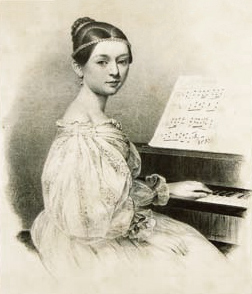
Clara Wieck, from an 1835 lithograph

Clara Wieck made her official debut on 28 October 1828 at the Gewandhaus in Leipzig, at age nine. The same year, she performed at the Leipzig home of Ernst Carus, director of the mental hospital at Colditz Castle. There, she met another gifted young pianist who had been invited to the musical evening, Robert Schumann, who was nine years older. Schumann admired Clara's playing so much that he asked permission from his mother to stop studying law, which had never interested him much, and take music lessons with Clara's father. While taking lessons, he rented a room in the Wieck household and stayed about a year.

From September 1831 to April 1832, Clara toured Paris and other European cities, accompanied by her father. In Weimar, she performed a bravura piece by Henri Herz for Goethe, who presented her with a medal with his portrait and a written note saying: "For the gifted artist Clara Wieck". During that tour, the violinist Niccolò Paganini, who was also in Paris, offered to appear with her. Her Paris recital was poorly attended because many people had fled the city due to an outbreak of cholera, but Chopin attended it. They met shortly after the performance, which marked the beginning of a mutual admiration and friendship. In return, Clara and Friedrich attended Chopin's Parisian debut on February 25, 1832. The tour marked her transition from a child prodigy to a young performer.

==== Success in Vienna ====
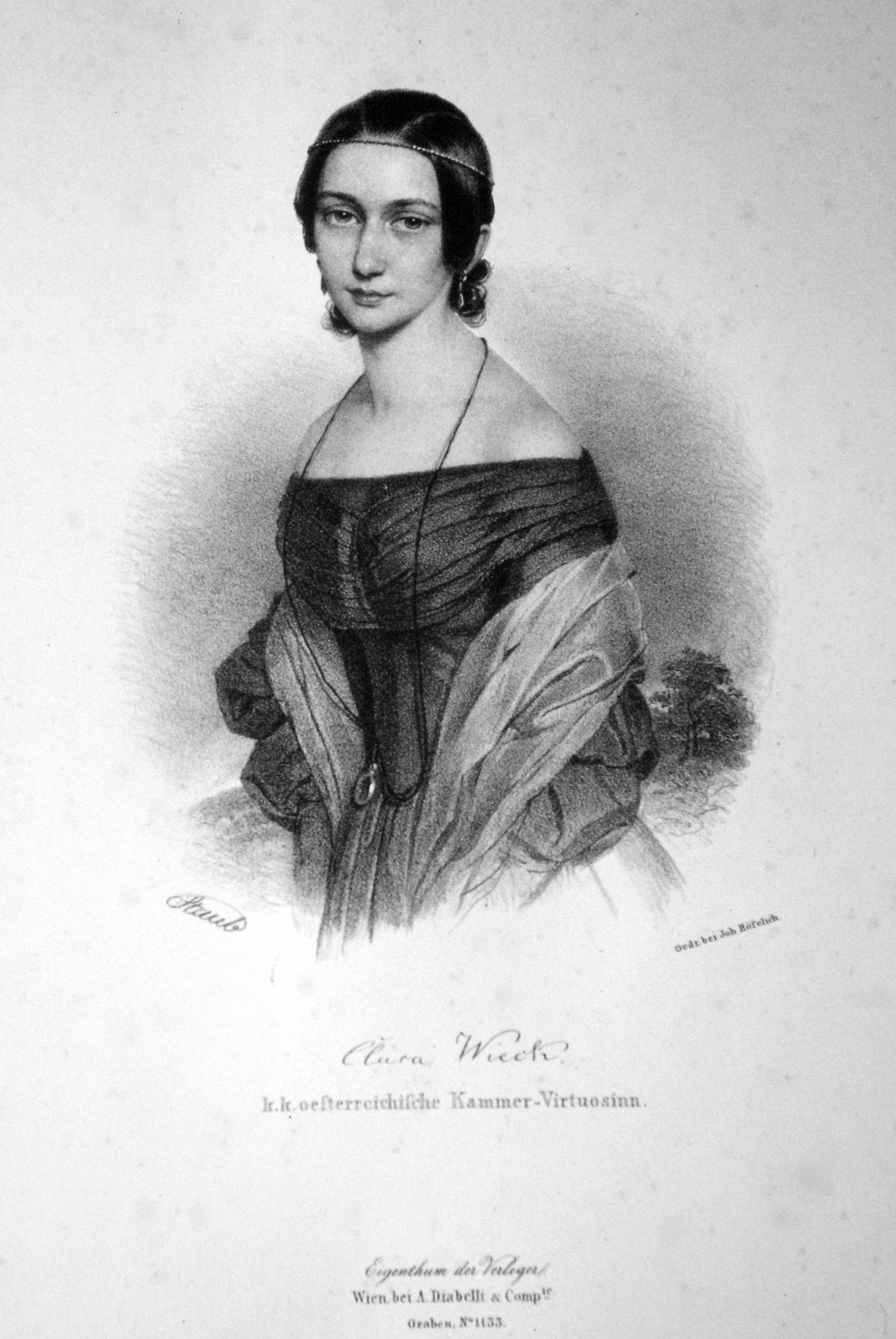
1839 lithograph

From December 1837 to April 1838, at the age of 18, Wieck performed a series of recitals in Vienna. Franz Grillparzer, Austria's leading dramatic poet, wrote a poem entitled "Clara Wieck and Beethoven" after hearing her perform Beethoven's Appassionata sonata during one of these recitals. She performed to sell-out crowds and laudatory critical reviews; Benedict Randhartinger, a friend of Franz Schubert, gave her an autographed copy of Schubert's Erlkönig, inscribing it "To the celebrated artist, Clara Wieck." Chopin described her playing to Franz Liszt, who came to hear one of Wieck's concerts and subsequently praised her extravagantly in a letter that was published in the Parisian Revue et Gazette Musicale and later, in translation, in the Leipzig journal Neue Zeitschrift für Musik. On 15 March, she was named a Königliche und Kaiserliche Österreichische Kammer-virtuosin ("Royal and Imperial Austrian Chamber Virtuoso"), Austria's highest musical honor.

An anonymous music critic, describing her Vienna recitals, said: "The appearance of this artist can be regarded as epoch-making... In her creative hands, the most ordinary passage, the most routine motive acquires a significant meaning, a colour, which only those with the most consummate artistry can give."

=== Lasting relationships ===
==== Robert Schumann ====
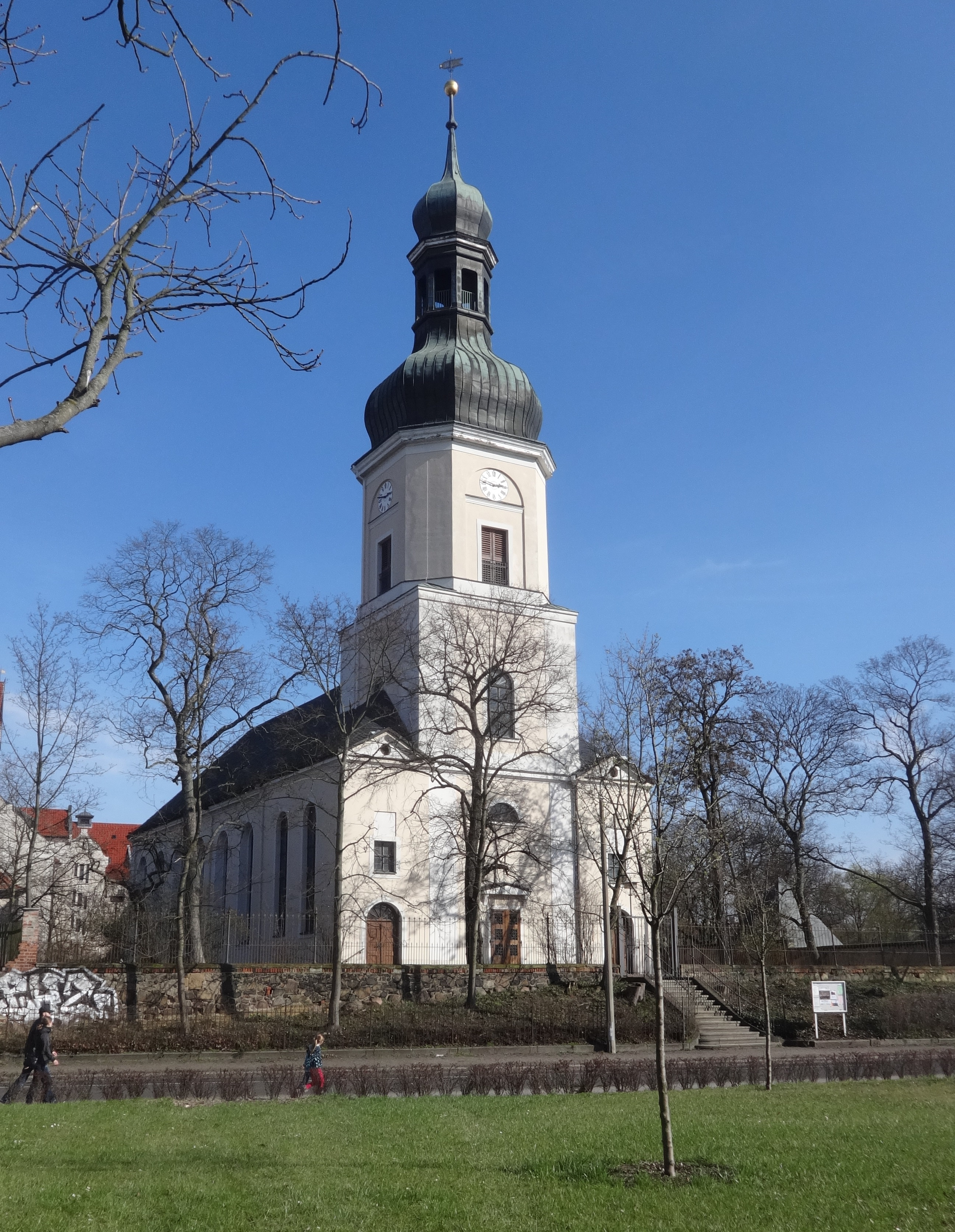
Schönefeld church, where the Schumanns married on 12 September 1840

Robert Schumann was a little more than nine years older than Wieck. In 1837, when she was 18, he proposed to her and she accepted. Robert then asked her father for her hand in marriage. Friedrich was strongly opposed to the marriage, and refused his permission. Robert and Clara decided to go to court and sue him. The judge allowed the marriage, which took place in Schönefeld church on 12 September 1840, the day before Clara's 21st birthday, when she attained majority status. From then on, the couple maintained a joint musical and personal diary of their life together.

In February 1854, Robert Schumann had a mental collapse, attempted suicide, and was admitted, at his request, to a sanatorium in the village of Endenich near Bonn, where he stayed for the last two years of his life. In March 1854, Brahms, Joachim, Albert Dietrich, and Julius Otto Grimm spent time with Clara Schumann, playing music for her and with her to divert her mind from the tragedy. Brahms composed some private piano pieces for her to console her: four piano pieces and a set of variations on a theme by Robert Schumann that she had also written variations on a year earlier, as her Op. 20. The music by Brahms was not intended to be published but for her alone. Brahms later thought to publish them anonymously, but eventually they were issued as his four Ballades, Op. 10, and Variations on a Theme by Robert Schumann, Op. 9. Brahms dedicated the variations to both Schumanns, hoping that Robert would be released soon and rejoined with his family.

For the entire two years of Robert Schumann's stay at the institution, his wife was not permitted to visit him, while Brahms visited him regularly. When it was apparent that Robert was near death, she was finally admitted to see him. He appeared to recognize her, but could only speak a few words. Robert Schumann died two days later, on 29 July 1856.

==== Joseph Joachim ====
The Schumanns first met violinist Joseph Joachim in November 1844, when he was 14 years old. A year later, Clara Schumann wrote in her diary that in a concert on 11 November 1845, "little Joachim was very much liked. He played a new violin concerto by Felix Mendelssohn, which is said to be wonderful." In May 1853, they heard Joachim play the solo part in Beethoven's Violin Concerto. She wrote that he played "with a finish, a depth of poetic feeling, his whole soul in every note, so ideally, that I have never heard violin-playing like it, and I can truly say that I have never received so indelible an impression from any virtuoso." A lasting friendship developed between Clara and Joseph, which for more than forty years never failed her in things great or small, never wavered in its loyalty.

Over her career, Schumann gave over 238 concerts with Joachim in Germany and Britain, more than with any other artist. The two were particularly noted for their playing of Beethoven's violin sonatas.

==== Johannes Brahms ====
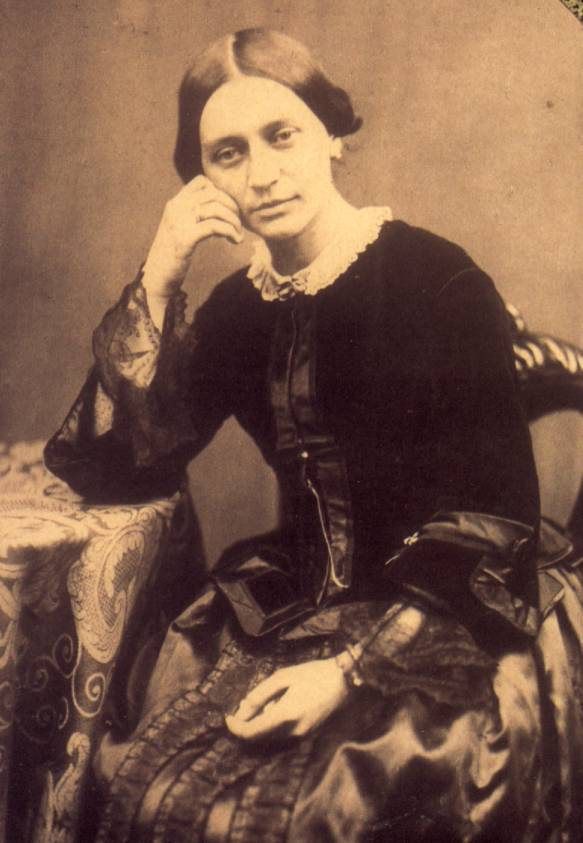
Clara Schumann in 1853

In early 1853, the then-unknown 20-year-old Johannes Brahms met Joachim and made a very favorable impression. Brahms received from him a letter of introduction to Robert Schumann, and thus presented himself at the Schumanns' home in Düsseldorf. Brahms played some of his piano solo compositions for the Schumanns, and they were deeply impressed. Robert published an article highly lauding Brahms, and Clara wrote in the diary that Brahms "seemed as if sent straight from God".

During Robert Schumann's last years, confined to an asylum, Brahms was a strong presence for the Schumann family. His letters indicate his strong feelings for Clara. Their relationship has been interpreted as somewhere between friendship and love, and Brahms always maintained the utmost respect for her, as a woman and a talented musician.

Brahms played his First Symphony for her before its premiere. She gave some advice about the Adagio, which he took to heart. She expressed her appreciation of the Symphony as a whole, but mentioned her dissatisfaction with the endings of the third and fourth movements. She was the first to perform many of his works in public, including the Variations and Fugue on a Theme by Handel, a solo piano work written by Brahms in 1861.

=== Concert tours ===
Clara Schumann first toured England in April 1856, while her husband was still living but unable to travel. She was invited to play in a London Philharmonic Society (Note: The Philharmonic Society of London had been formed in 1813. In 1912, it became the Royal Philharmonic Society.) concert by conductor William Sterndale Bennett, a good friend of Robert's. She was displeased with the little time spent on rehearsals: "They call it a rehearsal here if a piece is played through once." She wrote that musical "artists" in England "allow themselves to be treated as inferiors." She was happy, though, to hear the cellist Alfredo Piatti play with "a tone, a bravura, a certainty, such as I never heard before". In May 1856, she played Robert Schumann's Piano Concerto in A minor with the New Philharmonic Society (Note: The New Philharmonic Society began operating in 1852 with Dr. Wylde as co-founder: A Dictionary of Music and Musicians, Ed. George Grove, vol. 2, 1900, MacMillan, London, in Wikisource; article New Philharmonic Society, The by George Grove. The New Philharmonic ceased giving concerts in June 1879.) conducted by Dr Wylde, who as she said had "led a dreadful rehearsal" and "could not grasp the rhythm of the last movement". Still, she returned to London the following year and continued to perform in Britain for the next 15 years.

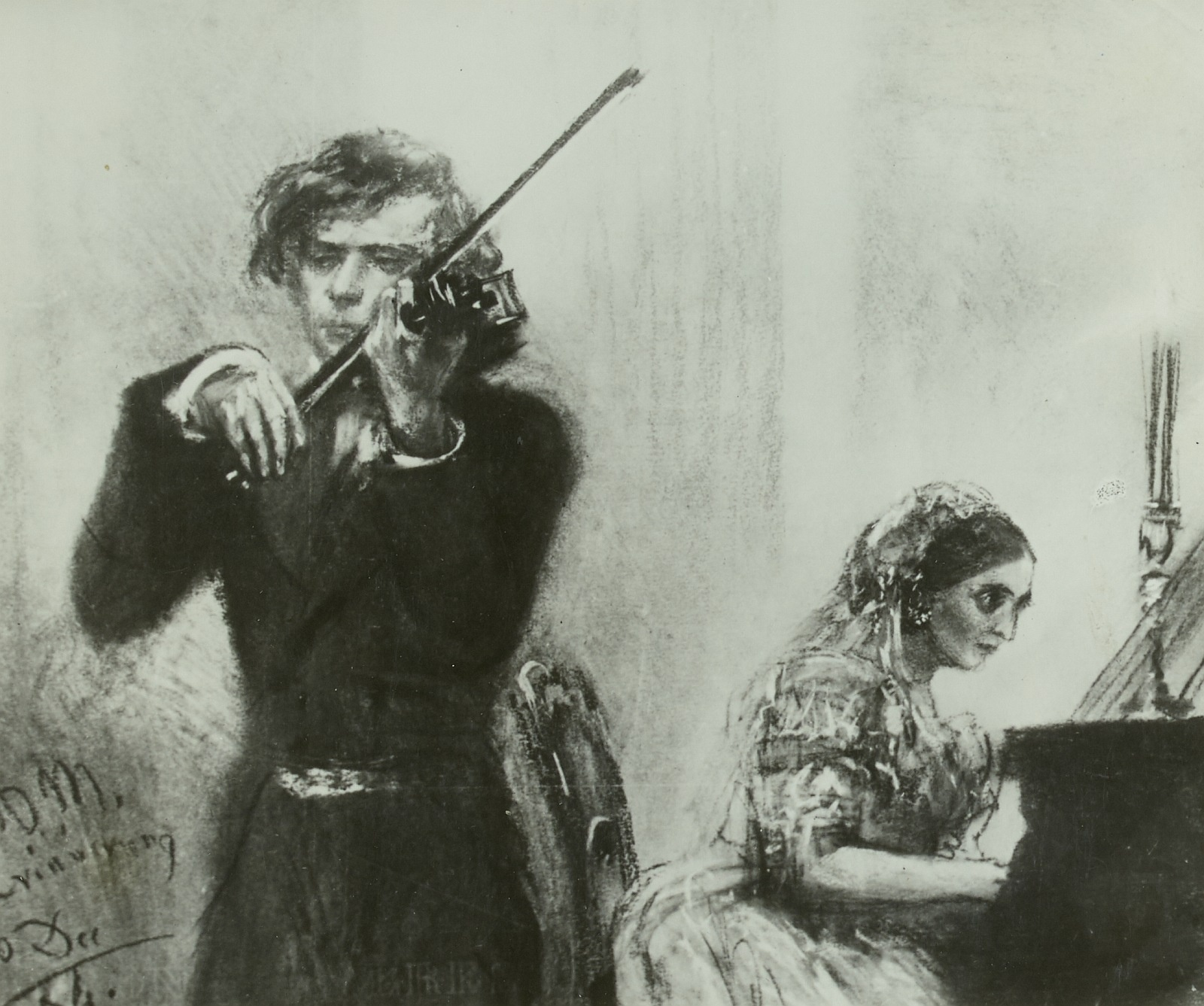
Joseph Joachim and Schumann, after a lost 1854 drawing by Adolph Menzel

In October–November 1857, Schumann and Joachim went on a recital tour to Dresden and Leipzig. St. James's Hall in London, which opened in 1858, hosted a series of "Popular Concerts" of chamber music. (Note: Some printed programs have been preserved in Arts & Humanities Research Council Concert Programmes, St. James's Hall Concerts (1867–1904)) Joachim visited London annually beginning in 1866. Schumann also spent many years in London participating in the Popular Concerts with Joachim and the celebrated Italian cellist Carlo Alfredo Piatti. Second violinist Louis Ries (nephew of composer Ferdinand Ries) and violist J. B. Zerbini usually played on the same concert programs. George Bernard Shaw, the leading playwright and also a music critic, wrote that the Popular Concerts helped greatly to spread and enlighten musical taste in England.

In January 1867, Schumann toured Edinburgh and Glasgow, Scotland, along with Joachim, Piatti, Ries, and Zerbini. Two sisters, Louisa and Susanna Pyne, singers and managers of an opera company in England, and a man named Saunders, made all the arrangements. She was accompanied by her oldest daughter Marie, who wrote from Manchester to her friend Rosalie Leser that in Edinburgh the pianist "was received with tempestuous applause and had to give an encore, so had Joachim. Piatti, too, is always tremendously liked." Marie also wrote: "For the longer journeys we had a saloon [car], comfortably furnished with arm-chairs and sofas... the journey ... was very comfortable." On this occasion, the musicians were not "treated as inferiors".

=== Later life ===
==== Concerts ====
Schumann still performed actively in the 1870s and 1880s. She performed extensively and regularly throughout Germany during these decades, and had engagements in Austria, Hungary, Belgium, Holland, and Switzerland. When in Basel, Switzerland, she often stayed with the Von der Mühll family. She continued her annual winter-spring concert tours of England, giving 16 of them between 1865 and 1888, often with violinist Joachim. In the meantime, beginning in the spring of 1863, Clara Schumann, accompanied by her seven children, began spending the holiday months in Lichtenthal, a town near Baden-Baden. This summer residence became a family meeting place after her intense work schedule, since her children were living apart in different cities across Europe. It was also a setting for constant music-making, owing to visits from prominent figures and friends such as Brahms and Joachim.

She took a break from concert performances, beginning in January 1874, cancelling her usual England tour due to an arm injury. In July, she consulted a doctor, who having massaged the arm, advised her to practice for only one hour a day. She rested for the remainder of the year before returning to the concert stage in March 1875. She had not fully recovered, and experienced more neuralgia in her arm again in May, reporting that she "could not write on account of my arm". By October 1875, she had recovered enough to begin another tour in Germany.

In addition to solo piano recitals, chamber music, and accompanying singers, she continued to perform frequently with orchestras. In 1877, she performed Beethoven's Fifth Piano Concerto in Berlin, with Woldemar Bargiel conducting, her half-brother by her mother's second marriage, and had tremendous success. In 1883, she performed Beethoven's Choral Fantasy with the newly-formed Berlin Philharmonic, and was enthusiastically celebrated, although she was playing with an injured hand in great pain, having fallen on a staircase the previous day. Later that year she played Beethoven's Fourth Piano Concerto (with her own cadenzas) with Joachim conducting the same orchestra, again to great acclaim.

In 1885, Schumann once again joined Joachim conducting Mozart's Piano Concerto in D minor, again playing her own cadenzas. The following day, she played her husband's Piano Concerto with Bargiel conducting. "I think I played fresher than ever", she wrote to Brahms, "What I liked very much about the concert was that I was able to give Woldemar the direction of it, who had longed for such an opportunity for years."

She played her last public concert in Frankfurt on 12 March 1891. The last work she played was Brahms's Variations on a Theme by Haydn, in a version for two pianos, with James Kwast.

==== Teaching ====
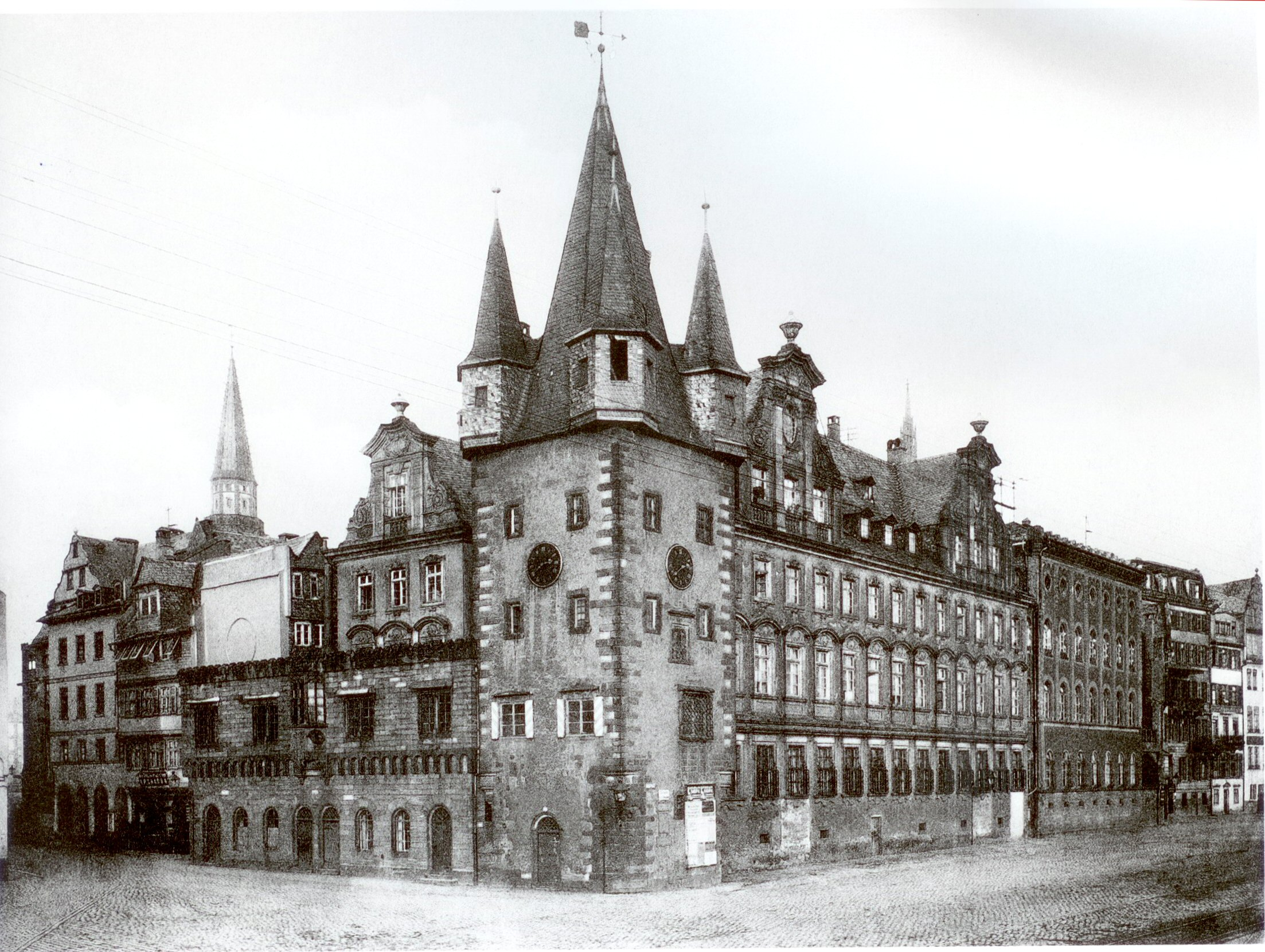
Saalhof, the first location of Dr. Hoch's Konservatorium

In 1878, Schumann was appointed the first piano teacher of the new Dr. Hoch's Konservatorium in Frankfurt. She had chosen Frankfurt among offers from Stuttgart, Hannover, and Berlin, because the director, Joachim Raff, had accepted her conditions: she could not teach more than 1-1/2 hours per day, was free to teach at her home, and had four months of vacation and time off for short tours in winter. She demanded two assistants, with her daughters Marie and Eugenie in mind.

She was the only woman on the faculty. Her fame attracted students from abroad, including Britain and the United States. She trained only advanced pupils, mostly young women, while her two daughters gave lessons to beginners. Among her 68 known students who made a musical career were Leonard Borwick, Fanny Davies, John Arthur St. Oswald Dykes, Ilona Eibenschütz, Nanette Falk (1835-1928), Carl Friedberg, Amina Goodwin, Natalia Janotha, Adelina de Lara, Marie Olson (1867-1916), Olga Radecki, Jane Roeckel, Franklin Taylor and Mary Wurm. The Konservatorium held events to celebrate her 50th year on stage in 1878 and her 60th career anniversary ten years later. She held the teaching post until 1892 and contributed greatly to the improvement of modern piano playing technique.

=== Death ===
Clara Schumann suffered a stroke on 26 March 1896, and died on 20 May at age 76. She was buried in Bonn, Germany at Alter Friedhof next to her husband, according to her own wish.

== Family life ==
Robert Schumann gave his wife a diary on their wedding day. His first entry indicates that it should act as an autobiography of the family's personal lives, especially of the couple, and of their desires and accomplishments in the arts. It also functioned as a record of their artistic endeavors and growth. She fully accepted the arrangement of a shared diary, as evidenced by her many entries. It demonstrates her loyal love for her husband, with a desire to combine two lives into one artistically, although this life-long goal involved risks.

The couple remained joint partners in both family life and their careers. She premiered many of his works, from solo piano works to her own piano versions of his orchestral works.

She often took charge of finances and general household affairs. Part of her responsibility included earning money by giving concerts, though she continued to play throughout her life, not just for the income but because she was an artist by training and nature. The burden of family duties increased over time and narrowed her ability as an artist. As a flourishing composer's wife, she was limited in her own explorations.

She was the main breadwinner for her family and the sole one after her husband was hospitalized and then died. She gave concerts and taught, and she did most of the work of organizing her own concert tours. She hired a housekeeper and a cook to keep house while she was away on her long tours.

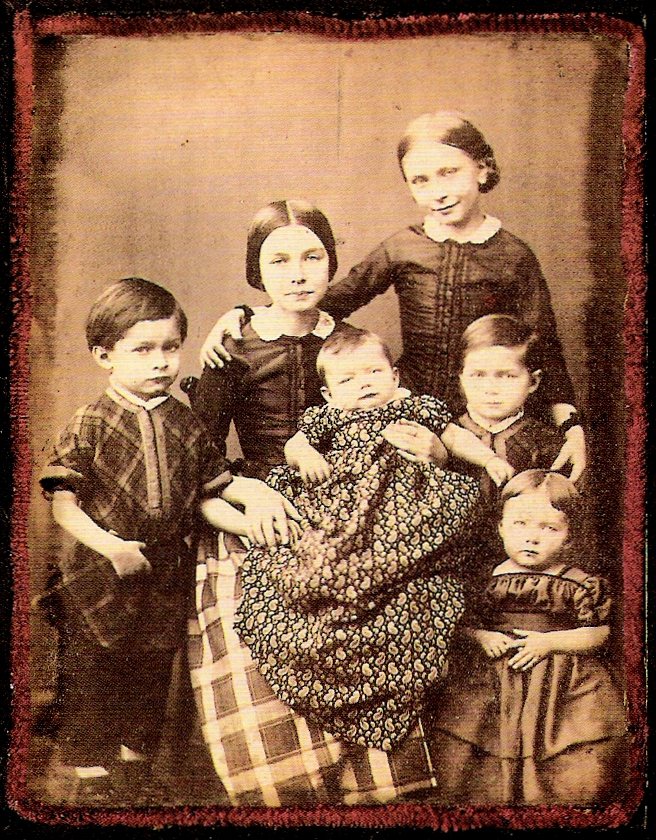
Robert and Clara Schumann's children (photo taken in 1853 or 1854); from left to right: Ludwig, Marie, Felix, Elise, Ferdinand and Eugenie.

The Schumanns had eight children in 13 years:

- Marie (1841–1929)
- Elise (1843–1928)
- Julie (1845–1872)
- Emil (1846–1847)
- Ludwig (1848–1899)
- Ferdinand (1849–1891)
- Eugenie (1851–1938)
- Felix (1854–1879)

A number of personal difficulties occurred in her life. Her husband was permanently institutionalized after a mental collapse. Her eldest living son Ludwig suffered from mental illness like his father and, in her words, eventually had to be "buried alive" in an institution. She became deaf in later life, and she often needed a wheelchair. Not only did her husband predecease her, but so did four of their children. Their first son, Emil, died in 1847, aged only 1. Their daughter Julie died in 1872, leaving two small children aged only 2 and 7, then raised by their grandmother. In 1879, their son Felix died aged 24. In 1891, their son Ferdinand died at the age of 41, leaving his children to her care.

Their oldest child Marie was of great support and help to her mother, taking the position of household cook. Marie also dissuaded her mother from continuing to burn letters that she had received from Brahms which he had asked her to destroy. Another daughter, Eugenie, who had been too young when her father died to remember him, wrote a book, Erinnerungen (Memoirs), published in 1925, covering her parents and Brahms.

Schumann famously rescued her children from violence during the May Uprising in Dresden in 1849. On the evening of 3 May, Robert and Clara heard that the revolution against King Frederick Augustus II of Saxony for not accepting the "constitution for a German Confederation" had arrived in Dresden. Most family members left and hid in a "neighbourhood security brigade", but on 7 May, she bravely walked back to Dresden to rescue her three children who had been left with a maid, defying a pack of armed men who confronted her, then walked back out of the city through the dangerous areas again.

== Music ==
=== Performance repertoire ===
During her lifetime, Schumann was an internationally renowned concert pianist. Over 1,300 concert programs from her performances throughout Europe between 1831 through 1889 have been preserved. She championed the works of her husband and other contemporaries such as Brahms, Chopin and Mendelssohn.

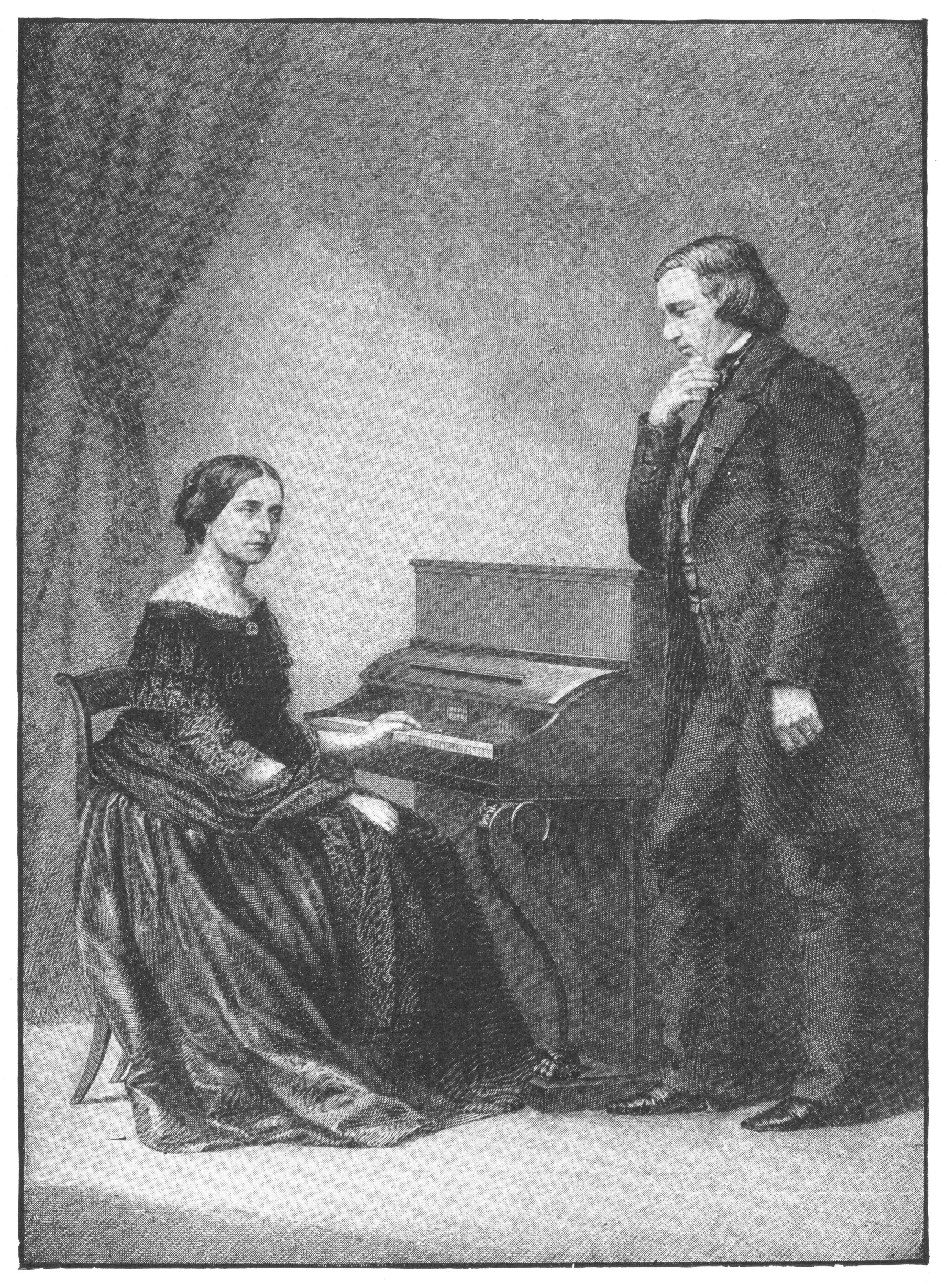
Clara and Robert Schumann, illustration from Famous Composers and their Works, 1906

The Schumanns were admirers of Chopin, especially of his Variations on "Là ci darem la mano", and she played the piece herself. When she was 14 and her future husband 23, he wrote to her:

Tomorrow precisely at eleven o'clock I will play the adagio from Chopin's Variations and at the same time I shall think of you very intently, exclusively of you. Now my request is that you should do the same, so that we may see and meet each other in spirit.

— Robert Schumann

In her early years, her repertoire, selected by her father, was showy and in the style common to the time, with works by Friedrich Kalkbrenner, Adolf von Henselt, Sigismond Thalberg, Henri Herz, Johann Peter Pixis, Carl Czerny and her own compositions. She turned to including compositions by Baroque composers such as Domenico Scarlatti and Johann Sebastian Bach, but performed especially contemporary music by Chopin, Mendelssohn and her husband, whose music did not attain popularity until the 1850s.

In 1835, she performed her Piano Concerto in A minor with the Leipzig Gewandhaus Orchestra, conducted by Mendelssohn. On 4 December 1845, she premiered Robert Schumann's Piano Concerto in Dresden. Following the advice of Brahms she performed Mozart's Piano Concerto in C minor at the Hanoverian court and in Leipzig.

Along with Arabella Goddard she was one of the first woman pianists to perform Beethoven's Hammerklavier Sonata in public, doing so on two occasions before 1856. Her busiest years as a performer were between 1856 and 1873, after her husband's death. During this period, she experienced success as a performer in Britain, where her 1865 performance of Beethoven's Piano Concerto in G major was met with enormous applause. As a chamber musician, she often gave concerts with violinist Joachim. In her later career, she frequently accompanied lieder singers in recitals.

=== Compositions ===
As part of the broad musical education given to her by her father, Clara Wieck learned to compose, and from childhood to middle age she produced a good body of work. Clara wrote that "composing gives me great pleasure... there is nothing that surpasses the joy of creation, if only because through it one wins hours of self-forgetfulness, when one lives in a world of sound". Her Op. 1 was Quatre Polonaises pour le pianoforte composed in 1831, and Op. 5 4 Pièces caractéristiques in 1836, all piano pieces for her recitals. She wrote her Piano Concerto in A minor at age 14, with some help from her future husband. She planned a second piano concerto, but only a Konzertsatz in F minor from 1847 survived.

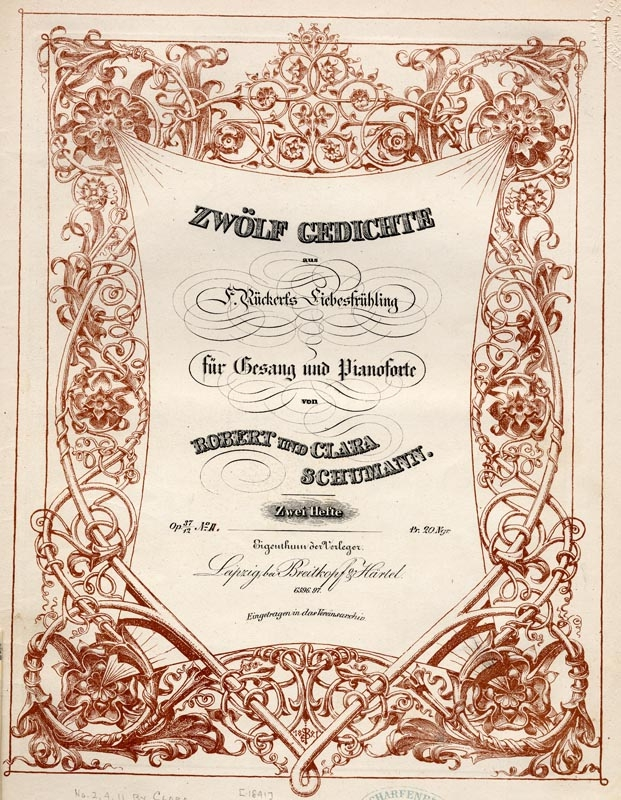
Zwölf Lieder auf F. Rückerts Liebesfrühling by Clara and Robert Schumann

After her marriage, she turned to lieder and choral works. The couple wrote and published one joint composition in 1841, setting a cycle of poems by Friedrich Rückert called Liebesfrühling (Spring of Love) in Zwölf Lieder auf F. Rückerts Liebesfrühling, her Op. 12 and his Op. 37. Her chamber works include the Piano Trio in G minor, Op. 17 (1846) and Three Romances for Violin and Piano, Op. 22 (1853), inspired by her husband's birthday. They were dedicated to Joachim, who performed them for George V of Hanover, who declared them a "marvellous, heavenly pleasure".

As she grew older, she became more preoccupied with other responsibilities in life and found it hard to compose regularly, writing, "I once believed that I possessed creative talent, but I have given up this idea; a woman must not desire to compose – there has never yet been one able to do it. Should I expect to be the one?" Her husband also expressed concern about the effect on her composing output:

Clara has composed a series of small pieces, which show a musical and tender ingenuity such as she has never attained before. But to have children, and a husband who is always living in the realm of imagination, does not go together with composing. She cannot work at it regularly, and I am often disturbed to think how many profound ideas are lost because she cannot work them out.

— Robert Schumann

She produced one to eight compositions every year beginning at age 11, until her output stopped in 1848, producing only a choral work that year for her husband's birthday and leaving her second piano concerto unfinished. These two works, while reserved for her opus 18 and 19, were never published. Five years later, however, when she was 34 in 1853, the year she met Brahms, she engaged in a flurry of composing, resulting in 16 pieces that year: a set of piano variations on an "Album Leaf" of her husband (his Op. 99 No. 4), eight "Romances" for piano solo and for violin and piano, and seven songs. These works were published a year later, after Robert's confinement, as her Op. 20 through 23.

For the next 43 years of her life, she only composed piano transcriptions of works by her husband and Brahms, including 41 transcriptions of Robert Schumann's lieder (commissioned by a publisher in 1872), and a short piano duet commissioned for a friend's wedding anniversary in 1879. In the last year of her life, she left several sketches for piano preludes, designed for piano students, as well as some published cadenzas for her performances of Beethoven and Mozart piano concertos.

Most of Clara Schumann's music was never played by anyone else and largely forgotten until a resurgence of interest in the 1970s. Today her compositions are increasingly performed and recorded.

=== Editor ===
Schumann was the authoritative editor, aided by Brahms and others, of her husband's works for the publishing firm of Breitkopf & Härtel. She also edited 20 sonatas by Domenico Scarlatti, letters (Jugendbriefe) by her husband in 1885, and his piano works with fingering and other instructions (Fingersatz und Vortragsbezeichnungen) in 1886.

=== "War of the Romantics" ===
In the early 1840s, the Schumanns were interested in the works of Franz Liszt and his young composer friends of what eventually became known as the New German School, but in the second half of the decade, they both became openly hostile toward Liszt because of their more musically conservative outlook and beliefs, Clara more so than Robert, as she had long been the more conservative aesthete in the Schumann marriage. By the mid-1850s, after Robert's decline, the young Brahms had joined the cause, and to promote her ideals and protect what she saw as an attack on her husband's beliefs, she, Brahms, and Joseph Joachim formed a group of conservative musicians who defended Robert Schumann's critical ideals of the legacy and respectability of music, the pinnacle of which had been Beethoven.

The opposing side of this "War of the Romantics", a group of radical progressives in music (most of them from Weimar) led by Liszt and Richard Wagner, desired to escape composing under the shadow of Beethoven, but to transcend the old forms and ideas of what music had been and instead create what music should be for the future. The Weimar school promoted the idea of program music, while both the Schumanns and Brahms of the Leipzig/Berlin school were strict in their stance that music must and can only be absolute music, a term derisively coined by Wagner.

One of Clara Schumann's difficulties with Liszt stemmed from a philosophical difference in performance practice. He believed that the artist, through physical and emotional performance, interpreted music for the audience. When he performed, Liszt flailed his arms, tossed his head, and pursed his lips, inspiring a Lisztomania across Europe which has been compared to the Beatlemania of female fans of The Beatles over a century later. Clara, in contrast, came to believe that the personality of the musician should be suppressed so that the composer's vision would be clearly evident to listeners.

Partisans led active campaigns with public demonstrations at concerts, writings published in the press denigrating reputations, and other public slights designed to embarrass their adversaries. Brahms published a manifesto for the "Serious Music" side on 4 May 1861, signed by Clara Schumann, Joachim, Albert Dietrich, Woldemar Bargiel, and twenty others, which decried the purveyors of the "Music of the Future" as "contrary to the innermost spirit of music, strongly to be deplored and condemned". The New Weimar Club, a formal society with Liszt at its center, held an anniversary celebration of the Neue Zeitschrift für Musik, the magazine Robert Schumann had founded, in his birthplace Zwickau, and conspicuously neglected to invite members of the opposing party, including his widow, Clara. Clara Schumann ceased to perform any of Liszt's works, and she suppressed her husband's dedication to Liszt of his Fantasie in C major when she published his complete works. When she heard that Liszt and Richard Wagner would be participating in a Beethoven centenary festival in Vienna in 1870, she refused to attend.

In describing the works of the opposing school, Clara Schumann was particularly scathing of Wagner, writing of his Tannhäuser, that he "wears himself out in atrocities", describing Lohengrin as "horrible", and referring to Tristan und Isolde as "the most repugnant thing I have ever seen or heard in all my life". She also complained that Wagner had spoken of her husband, Mendelssohn, and Brahms in a "scornful" way. Wagner had poked fun at the musical conservatives in an essay, portraying them as "a musical temperance society" awaiting a Messiah. She held Anton Bruckner's Seventh Symphony in very low esteem and wrote to Brahms, describing it as "a horrible piece". Bruckner's symphonies were seen as representative of the New Music due to their advanced harmony, massive orchestration and extended time-scale. Schumann was more impressed, however, with the early First Symphony in F minor by Richard Strauss; this was before Strauss began composing the highly programmatic music for which he later became famous.

Brahms secretly held Wagner's music in high esteem, and eventually publicly praised Liszt's works as well. Several of the proponents and signers of the manifesto, including Joachim, relented and joined the "other side". The controversy eventually died down, but Clara Schumann remained steadfast in her disapproval of the New German School's music.

== Legacy ==
=== Impact during her lifetime ===
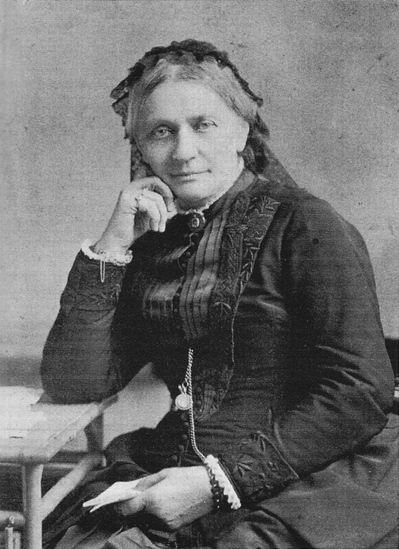
Schumann, according to Edvard Grieg "one of the most soulful and famous pianists of the day"

Although Schumann was not widely recognized as a composer for many years after her death, she had a lasting effect as a pianist. Trained by her father to play by ear and memorize, she gave public performances from memory as early as age thirteen, a fact noted as exceptional by her reviewers. She was one of the first pianists to perform from memory, making it the standard for concerts. She was also instrumental in changing the kind of program expected of concert pianists. In her early career, before her marriage, she played the customary bravura pieces designed to showcase the artist's technique, often in the form of arrangements or variations on popular themes from operas, written by virtuosos such as Thalberg, Herz, or Henselt. As it was customary to play one's own compositions, she included at least one of her own works in every program, such as Variations on a Theme by Bellini (Op. 8) and the popular Scherzo (Op. 10). However, as she became a more independent artist, her repertoire contained mainly music by leading composers.

Schumann influenced pianists through her teaching, which emphasized expression and a singing tone, with technique subordinated to the intentions of the composer. One of her students, Mathilde Verne, carried her teaching to England where she taught, among others, Solomon. Another of her students, Carl Friedberg, carried the tradition to the Juilliard School in the United States, where his students included Nina Simone, Malcolm Frager, and Bruce Hungerford.

She was also instrumental in getting the works of Robert Schumann recognized, appreciated and added to standard classical repertoire. She promoted his works tirelessly throughout her life.

=== Film ===
Clara Schumann has been portrayed on screen many times. Träumerei (Dreaming), the oldest known Schumann film, premiered on 3 May 1944 in Zwickau. Possibly the best-known film is Song of Love (1947) starring Katharine Hepburn as Clara, Paul Henreid as Robert, and Robert Walker as Brahms.

In 1954, Loretta Young portrayed her on The Loretta Young Show in Season 1, Episode 26: The Clara Schumann Story (first aired on 21 March 1954), in which she supports the composing career of her husband, played by George Nader, alongside Shelley Fabares and Carleton G. Young.

Two more recent German films are Frühlingssinfonie (Spring Symphony) (1983), starring Nastassja Kinski as Clara, and the 2008 Helma Sanders-Brahms' film Geliebte Clara (Beloved Clara), where she is portrayed by Martina Gedeck.

=== Theatre ===
Clara Schumann's life has been explored in the chamber opera Clara by composer Victoria Bond and librettist Barbara Zinn-Krieger, and the two-act opera Ghost Variations by composer Tony Manfredonia and librettist Aiden K. Feltkamp. Twin Spirits, a live theatrical performance involving a chamber ensemble of actors, singers, and musicians, also delves into Clara Schumann's life story. Elfriede Jelinek wrote the play Clara S, musikalische Tragödie (1982) about a fictional meeting between Clara Schumann and Gabriele D'Annunzio.

=== Banknote and conservatory ===
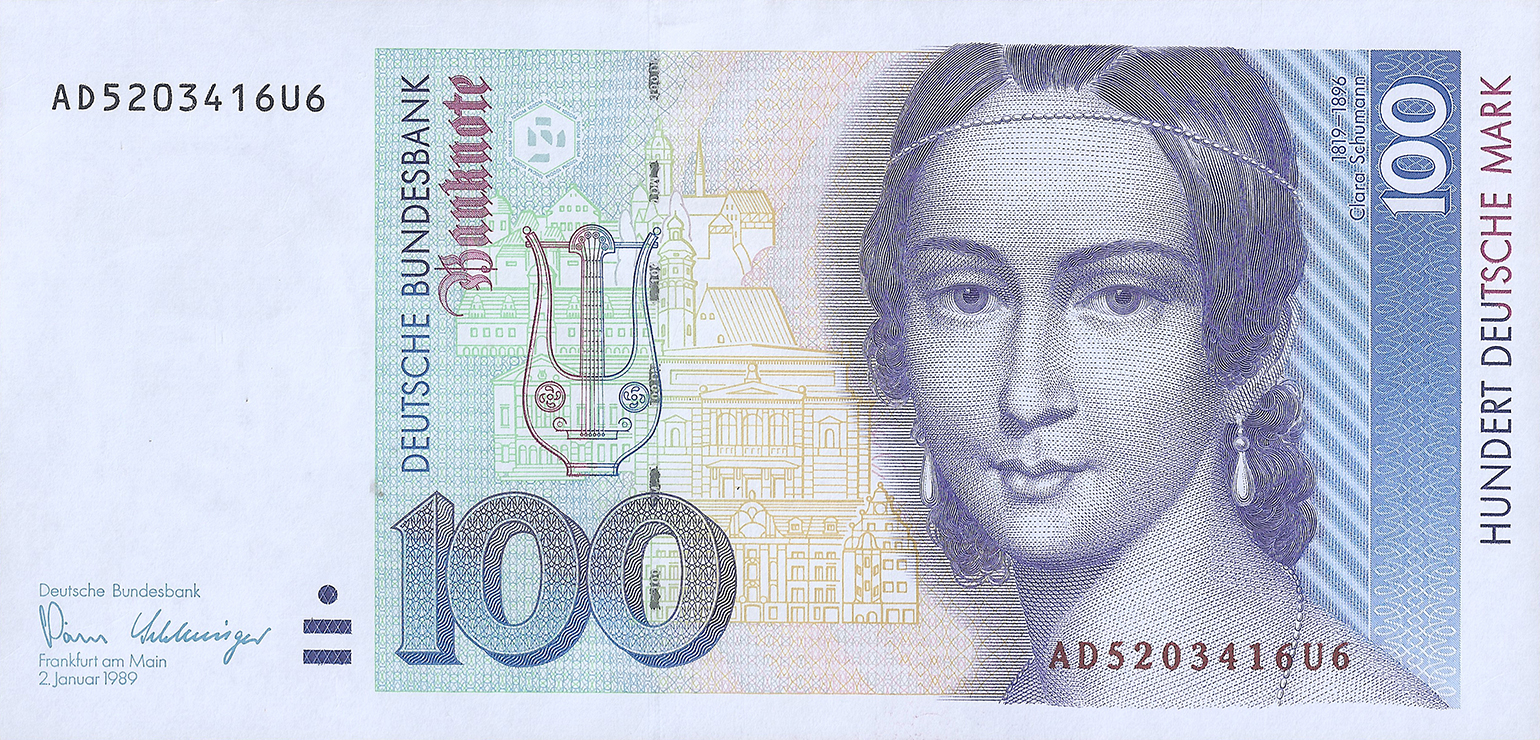
100 Deutsche Mark note (obverse)

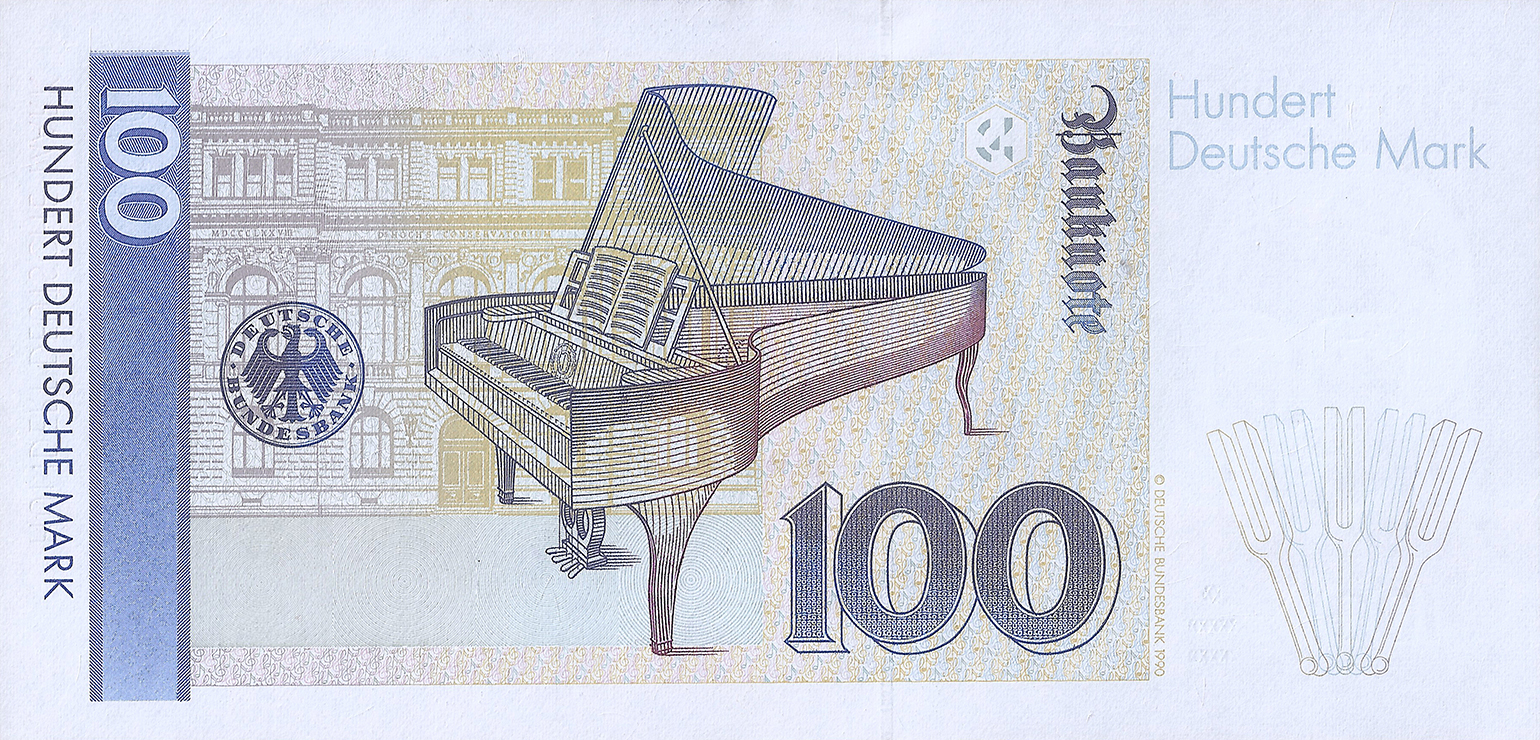
100 Deutsche Mark note (reverse)

An image of Clara Schumann from an 1835 lithograph by Andreas Staub was featured on the 100 Deutsche Mark banknote from 2 January 1989 until Germany’s adoption of the Euro on 1 January 2002. The back of the banknote shows a grand piano she played and the exterior of Dr. Hoch's Konservatorium. The great hall of the conservatory's new building is named after her.

=== Media ===
Compared to her contemporaries, Schumann's music is not often found in media or soundtracks, except in documentaries and educational films. In Geliebte Clara (Beloved Clara), selections from Three Romances, Op. 11, are her only compositions displayed in the film, played by pianist Jenő Jandó. The "Clara" motif of five descending notes, initially written by her husband in her Romance Varie, was re-interpreted many times by both her husband and Johannes Brahms. The motif is strongly associated with the love between Clara and Robert; it can be heard throughout the film Song of Love (1947). Schumann's music is found in educational material, emphasizing her stature and remarkable presence as a female composer in a male dominated field.

== See also ==
- Schmorsdorf lime tree
