= Robert Schumann Prize of the City of Zwickau =

German classical music award

- Awarded for: "outstanding singers, instrumentalists and ensembles as well as musicologists and musical institutions, who have rendered special credits to the care and interpretation of Schumann’s musical and literary heritage as well as the knowledge of his life."
- Location: Zwickau
- Country: East Germany; Germany
- Presented by: Lord Mayor
- Rewards: €10,000, certificate, bronze medal
- First award: 1964
- Website: Robert Schumann Prize Zwickau

The Robert Schumann Prize of the City of Zwickau is a classical music award. Since 1964 it has been awarded by the Lord Mayor of Zwickau. Robert Schumann was born in Zwickau. Between 1964 and 2002 the prize was awarded annually, since 2003 biennially. The award is given to outstanding singers, instrumentalists and ensembles as well as musicologists and musical institutions, who have rendered special service (sic) to cherishing and presenting Schumann’s musical and literary heritage as well as to the knowledge of his life and works. The prize is endowed with a total of €10,000. The winners receive a certificate and a bronze medal with the portrait of Schumann, created by the sculptor Gerhard Lichtenfeld.

== Jury ==
The jury includes:

- the Lord Mayor of Zwickau
- the mayor of social affairs and culture
- a member of the Culture and Education Committee of the City of Zwickau
- the chairman of the Robert Schumann Society Zwickau e.V.
- the director of the Robert Schumann House

== Recipients ==
- 1964 Georg Eismann, Hans Storck, Annerose Schmidt
- 1965 Karl Laux, Lore Fischer
- 1966 Daniel Zhitomirsky, Dieter Zechlin
- 1967 Olivier Alain
- 1968 Sviatoslav Richter
- 1969 Peter Schreier, Herbert Schulze
- 1970 Dmitri Bashkirov, Martin Schoppe
- 1971 Günther Leib, Tatiana Nikolayeva
- 1972 Ekkehard Otto, Maria Maxakowa
- 1973 Emil Gilels, Elisabeth Breul
- 1974 Amadeus Webersinke, Nelly Akopian-Tamarina
- 1975 Zara Dolukhanova, Hélène Boschi
- 1976 Sigrid Kehl, Eliso Virsaladze
- 1977 Rudolf Kehrer, Herbert Kaliga
- 1978 Gertraud Geißler, Hans Joachim Köhler
- 1979 Hanne-Lore Kuhse, František Rauch
- 1980 Theo Adam, Miklós Forrai
- 1981 Kurt Masur, Halina Czerny-Stefańska
- 1982 Mitsuko Shirai, Peter Rösel
- 1983 Rudolf Fischer, Eva Fleischer
- 1984 Gustáv Papp, Dezső Ránki
- 1985 Pavel Lisitsian, Jacob Lateiner
- 1986 Jörg Demus, Gerd Nauhaus
- 1987 Dietrich Fischer-Dieskau
- 1988 Albrecht Hofmann
- 1989 Pavel Egorov, Bernard Ringeissen
- 1990 Hartmut Höll, Günther Müller
- 1991 Joan Chissell
- 1992 Abegg Trio, Gisela Schäfer
- 1993 Jozef De Beenhouwer
- 1994 Wolfgang Sawallisch
- 1995 Hansheinz Schneeberger, Dieter-Gerhardt Worm
- 1996 Nancy B. Reich, Bernhard R. Appel
- 1997 Nikolaus Harnoncourt
- 1998 Linda Correll Roesner, Olaf Bär
- 1999 Altenberg Trio, Ernst Burger
- 2000 Olga Loseva, Steven Isserlis
- 2001 John Eliot Gardiner
- 2002 Alfred Brendel
- 2003 Joachim Draheim, Juliane Banse
- 2005 Daniel Barenboim
- 2006 Margit L. McCorkle, Anton Kuerti
- 2009 Reinhard Kapp, Michael Struck
- 2011 András Schiff
- 2013 Jon W. Finson, Ulf Wallin
- 2015 Robert-Schumann-Forschungsstelle Düsseldorf
- 2017 Heinz Holliger
- 2019 Ragna Schirmer, Janina Klassen
- 2021 Thomas Synofzik
- 2023 Christian Gerhaher/Gerold Huber, Florian Uhlig
- 2025 Tiffany Poon
