= Margit L. McCorkle =

American-Canadian musicologist

Margit L. McCorkle (born 1942) is a musicologist, music bibliographer, editor, translator, pianist, and harpsichordist.

== Life and studies ==
Born in the United States, Margit L. McCorkle settled in Vancouver, Canada, in 1972, together with her husband, Donald M. McCorkle, professor and Head of Music at the University of British Columbia. Her earlier professional training was as concert pianist and harpsichordist, followed by Ph.D. studies in musicology and music bibliography at the University of Maryland. Together, the McCorkles pursued source studies on the music of Johannes Brahms in Maryland and then in Vancouver (1966-1978).

Following Donald's death in 1978, she initiated the preparation of the definitive scholarly thematic catalogue of all the works of Johannes Brahms under the auspices of the University of British Columbia Faculty of Arts. This project was supported by major research grants from the Social Sciences and Humanities Research Council of Canada and culminated in the publication of the Brahms catalogue in 1984 by G. Henle Verlag in Munich. In 1985, the Federal Republic of Germany conferred on her the Order of Merit [Bundesverdienstkreuz am Bande] in recognition of her great service to German music literature.

In 1989, McCorkle was invited to prepare the definitive scholarly thematic catalogue of all the works of Robert Schumann under the auspices of the Robert-Schumann-Forschungsstelle/Gesellschaft in Düsseldorf and Zwickau, to be supported by the Peter-Klöckner-Stiftung in Duisburg. In 2003 this project culminated in joint publication of the Schumann catalogue by the publishers G. Henle Verlag and Schott Music International (Mainz). McCorkle was honored in 2007 as co-recipient of the Robert Schumann Prize of the City of Zwickau (Robert-Schumann-Preis der Stadt Zwickau).

It has more than once been noted that Margit L. McCorkle is to date the only musicologist/bibliographer to have prepared monumental catalogues for two major classical composers, that is, for Johannes Brahms and Robert Schumann. In addition to these works, her scholarly bibliography since 1973 has included monographs, articles, and invited papers within the context of international conferences and publications featuring Brahms and Schumann studies, together with redacting Brahms music editions and writing commentaries for Brahms and Schumann autograph facsimiles. Since 1998 she has prepared recent English translations of scholarly German texts, primarily for the ongoing complete editions of the music of Robert Schumann (RSA) and Carl Maria von Weber (WeGA), published in Mainz by Schott Music International. She is also engaged as translator for the G. Henle Verlag and Breitkopf & Härtel Verlag (Wiesbaden).

== Works ==
=== Books ===
- Johannes Brahms Thematisch-Bibliographisches Werkverzeichnis. Herausgegeben nach gemeinsamen Vorarbeiten mit Donald M. McCorkle†. Munich: G. Henle Verlag, 1984, lxvii + 841. ISBN 3-87328-041-8.
- Robert Schumann Thematisch-Bibliographisches Werkverzeichnis. Unter Mitwirkung von Akio Mayeda und der Robert-Schumann-Forschungsselle; herausgegeben von der Robert-Schumann-Gesellschaft, Düsseldorf. Munich: G. Henle Verlag, 2003, 83* + 1012. ISBN 3-87328-110-4.

=== Papers ===
- In collaboration with Donald M. McCorkle, "Five Fundamental Obstacles in Brahms Source Research," in: Acta Musicologica, vol. 48 (1976), pp.|253ff.
- "Die Erhalten Quellen der Werke von Johannes Brahms. Autographe, Abschriften, Korrekturabzüge," in: Musik Edition Interpretation. Gedenkschrift, Günther Henle, ed. Martin Bente, Munich: G. Henle Verlag, 1980, pp. 338–354, ISBN 3-87328-032-9.
- "Die 'Hanslick'-Walzer, Opus 39," in: Brahms Congress Wien 1983, eds. Susanne Antonicek and Otto Biba, Tutzing: H. Schneider, 1988, pp. 379–386, ISBN 3-7952-0404-6.
- "The Role of Trial performances for Brahms's Orchestral and Large Choral Works: Sources and Circumstances," in Brahms Studies, ed. George S. Bozarth, Oxford: Clarendon Press, 1990, p. 295–330, ISBN 0-19-311922-6.
- "Von Brahms zu Schumann oder Reflexionen über das Erstellen von Werkverzeichnisse," in: Robert Schumann und die Französische Romantik. (Bericht über das 5. Internationale Schumann-Symposium der Robert-Schumann-Gesellschaft vom 9. und 10. Juli 1994), ed. Ute Bär, Mainz: Schott, 1997, p. 265–274, ISBN 3-7957-0335-2.
- "When Did Schumann Find Time to Compose? - Some Biographical Observations from a Bibliographical Project," in: Schumanniana nova. Festchrift Gerd Nauhaus zum 60th Geburtstag, eds. Bernhard R. Appel, Ute Bär, Sinzig: Studio-Verlag, 2002, p. 487–498, ISBN 3-89564-085-9.

=== Pieces of music ===
- Johannes Brahms Symphony No. 1 in C Minor, Opus 68. The Autograph Score. With an Introduction by Margit L. McCorkle. New York: The Pierpont Morgan Library in association with Dover Publications, 1986.
- Johannes Brahms, Variationen über ein Thema von Schumann, Opus 9, ed. Margit L. McCorkle. Munich: G. Henle Verlag, 1987.
- Johannes Brahms, Variationen, Opus 21 Nr. 1 und Nr. 2, ed. Margit L. McCorkle. Munich: G. Henle Verlag, 1988.
- Robert Schumann, Waldszenen, Opus 82, Faksimile nach dem Autograph im Besitz der Bibliothèque nationale de France, Paris. Nachwort von Margit L. McCorkle. G. Henle Verlag, 2005, [1]-28.

=== Translations ===
- Robert Schumann Neue Ausgabe sämtlicher Werke, Mainz: Schott Music International: VII/3/4(1998); VI/6,2 (2009); VII/3,1 (2010); IV/3/1b (2011); VII/3,2 (2011); III/1/5 (2012); III/3 (2012), IV/3/1,2 (2012); I/3 (2013); I/1/6 (2014); III/1/3 (2014); VII/1/2 (2014), I/1/4 (2015), II/ (2015), III/1/4 (2016). [Weblink: New Complete Edition – Schumann Portal]
- Thematisch-chronologisches Verzeichnis der Werke Max Regers und ihrer Quellen, Preface and Introduction. Munich: G. Henle Verlag, 2012.
- Carl Maria von Weber Sämtliche Werke, Mainz: Schott Music International: III/11a/b (2009);VI/2 (2009); III/11a/b; V/6 (2010); VIII/7 (2010); III/3a, III/3b, III/3c (2011); III/4 (2012); VIII/12 (2012); II/1 (2013); VI/1 (2013), VII/1 (2015), V/4b (2016). [Weblink: Digital Edition of the Carl-Maria-von-Weber-Gesamtausgabe]
