= Thomas Synofzik =

German musicologist

Thomas Synofzik (born 30 December 1966) is a German musicologist. He is director of the Robert Schumann House in Zwickau.

== Life ==
Synofzik was born in Dortmund. After achieving the Abitur, he studied church music at the Dortmund University of Music. He studied musicology and philosophy at the University of Cologne as well as historical keyboard instruments at the conservatories in Cologne and Brussels. The doctorate followed between 1998 and 2000. In addition to regular concert activities, CD and radio productions, from 1998 to 2005 he worked as a lecturer at universities in Dortmund, Folkwang University of the Arts, Cologne, Detmold and Trossingen and was a freelancer for various radio stations.

Synofzik has been director of the Robert Schumann House in Zwickau since 2015. He is one of the main editors of what is one of the largest edition project dedicated to a composer. The complete correspondence between Robert and Clara Schumann should be available in 50 volumes by 2025.

He has written numerous books, sheet music publications and scientific articles on the life and work of the composer Robert Schumann and his wife Clara., the Schumann-Brahms circle, the music of the early 17th century and the history of interpretation of the 20th century. In his first publications and research contributions, he also devoted himself in many ways to the environment of Johann Sebastian Bach.

== Awards ==
- 2021 Robert Schumann Prize of the City of Zwickau

== Books ==
- Briefe und Dokumente im Schumannhaus Bonn-Endenich, Bonn 1993
- Heinrich Grimm. Cantilena est loquela canens. Studien zur Überlieferung und Kompositionstechnik. Eisenach 2000
- Heinrich Bach, Kyrie zu sechs Stimmen, Stuttgart 2001
- Rheinische Sängerinnen des 20. Jahrhunderts. Eine Dokumentation in Wort und Ton. (together with Susanne Rode-Breymann), Kassel 2003
- Heinrich Heine – Robert Schumann. Musik und Ironie. 2nd edit., Cologne: Dohr, 2010, ISBN 978-3-936655-77-3

== Essays ==
- Kantaten von Alessandro Scarlatti im Bücken-Nachlass der Kölner Universitätsbibliothek, in Aspetti musicali. Musikhistorische Dimensionen Italiens 1600 bis 2000. Festschrift für Dietrich Kämper zum 65. Geburtstag, edited by Norbert Bolin, Christoph von Blumröder and Imke Misch, Cologne, Dohr 2001
- Mendelssohn, Schumann und das Problem der Männergesangskomposition. in Schumanniana nova. Festschrift Gerd Nauhaus zum 60. Geburtstag, Sinzig: Studio-Verlag 2002, pp. 739–766
- Die Schumann-Biographie Wilhelm Joseph von Wasielewski (Dresden 1858), in Schumann und Dresden. Bericht über das Symposion "Robert und Clara Schumann in Dresden – biographische, kompositionsgeschichtliche und soziokulturelle Aspekte" in Dresden vom 15. bis 18. Mai 2008, edited by Thomas Synofzik and Hans-Günter Ottenberg (Studien zum Dresdner Musikleben im 19. Jahrhundert, vol. 1), Cologne: Dohr 2010
