= Ernst Burger (disambiguation) =

Ernst Burger (1906–1975) was a German-American who was a spy and saboteur for Germany during World War II.

Ernst Burger may also refer to:

- Ernst Burger (musicologist) (born 1937), German pianist and musicologist

== See also ==
- Ernst Berger (born 1913), Swiss skier
