= Michael Struck =

Michael Struck (born in 1952) is a German musicologist, music critic and pianist. Together with Reinhard Kapp Struck won the 2009 Robert Schumann Prize of the City of Zwickau for his 1984 thesis on Schumann's late work.
