= David Köler =

German composer (c. 1532–1565)

David Köler, also Koler, Colerus (c. 1532 – 1565) was a German composer.

== Life ==
Köler was born and died in Zwickau. He was educated in his native town and at the University of Ingolstadt. From 1554 he was probably Kantor in Schlaggenwald in Bohemia. In 1556-7 he moved to Joachimsthal and then in Altenburg. In 1563 he was appointed Kapellmeister at the court of Mecklenburg at Schwerin serving the Duke Johann Albrecht. In 1565 he was back to Zwickau where he died few months later.

== Works ==
- Zehen Psalmen Davids, 5, 6vv (Leipzig, 1554)
- Rosa florum gloria, 1567
- Mass (on Josquin's Benedictus es coelorum regina), 7vv
- Kyrie, Gloria, 4vv
- Non nobis, Domine, 5vv
- Te sanctum, responsory, 6vv
- Veni Sancte Spiritus, 4, 5vv
- Ach Herr, straf mich nicht in deinem Zorn (Ps vi), 6vv
- Hülf, Herr, die Heiligen haben abgenommen (Ps xii), 6vv
- Richte mich Gott (Ps xliii), 6vv
- Eile, Gott, mich zu erretten (Ps lxx), 6vv
- Wer unter dem Schirm des Höchsten sitzt (Ps xci), 6vv
- Siehe, wie fein und lieblich (Ps cxxxiii), 6vv

== Sources ==
- Walter Blankenburg's article in New Grove Dictionary of Music
- G. Eismann: David Köler: ein protestantischer Komponist des 16. Jahrhunderts (Berlin, 1956)

== Bibliography ==
- Otto Kade (1882). "Köler, David". Allgemeine Deutsche Biographie (in German). Vol. 16. Leipzig: Duncker & Humblot. pp. 467–472.
- Georg Eismann: David Köler: ein protestantischer Komponist des 16. Jahrhunderts. Berlin: Evangelische Verlags-Anstalt 1956
- Grewolls, Grete (2011). Wer war wer in Mecklenburg und Vorpommern. Das Personenlexikon (in German). Rostock: Hinstorff Verlag. p. 5207. ISBN 978-3-356-01301-6.
