= Werner Braun =

Werner Braun may refer to:

- Werner Braun (photojournalist), Israeli photographer
- Werner Braun (musicologist), German musicologist
