= Martin Schoppe =

German painter

Martin Karl Hermann Schoppe (24 October 1936 – 28 April 1998) was a German musicologist and painter.

== Life ==
Born in Leimbach near Mansfeld, In 1956 Schoppe studied art history, music education, physical education and musicology at the Martin Luther University of Halle-Wittenberg. In 1961 he passed the state examination as a musicologist. In 1962 Schoppe began his first attempts at painting using various techniques. In 1968 he was awarded his doctorate at the Martin Luther University of Halle-Wittenberg. From 1965 to 1992 he was director of the Robert Schumann House in Zwickau.

From 1974 Schoppe was also artistic director of the Robert Schumann International Competition for Pianists and Singers of the city of Zwickau and from 1990 to 1996 chairman of the Robert Schumann Society Zwickau. Martin Schoppe lived as a painter and graphic artist in the Saxon town of Lichtenstein.

Schoppe died in Zwickau at age 61.

== Publications ==
- Schumann im Spiegel der Tagesliteratur. Ein Beitrag zur Erforschung der Schumann-Rezeption zwischen 1830 und 1856. Phil. Diss. Halle/Saale 1968.
- Vorwort zu Robert Schumann –Tagebücher vol. I (1827–1838). Published by Georg Eismann. Leipzig 1971 (Lizenzausgabe Basel/Frankfurt 1988).
- with Gerd Nauhaus: Das Robert-Schumannhaus Zwickau. Zwickau 1973.
- Robert Schumann, Selbstbiografische Notizen. Faksimile und Übertragung. Hg. im Auftrag der Robert-Schumann-Gesellschaft Zwickau, 1977.
- Robert Schumann 1810–1856 – Seine Kindheit und Jugend in Zwickau. Published by Robert-Schumann-Haus Zwickau on the occasion of the IX International Robert Schumann Competition and the 175th birthday of Robert Schumann, Zwickau 1981.
- Illustrations to Hunde, Kinderbuchverlag Berlin, 1990.
- Illustrations to Ein Mädchen fand einen Stein, by Pludra, Benno, Berlin, Kinderbuchverlag, 1981

== Bibliography ==
- Martin Schoppe 1936–1998, Kulturamt Zwickau / Galerie am Domhof Zwickau im Auftrag der Stadt Zwickau, Redaction Wilfried Stoye and Karla Schoppe, October 2001
