= Herbert Schulze =

Herbert Schulze may refer to:

- Herbert Schulze (musicologist) (1923-1975), German expert on Schumann
- Herbert Schulze (soldier), German Waffen-SS officer, recipient of the Knight's Cross of the Iron Cross in 1943
- Herbert Schultze, German U-boat commander of the Kriegsmarine
