= Bernhard R. Appel =

German musicologist

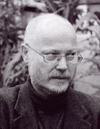
Bernhard Appel in 2014

Bernhard R. Appel (born 20 February 1950 in Wallersdorf, Lower Bavaria) is a German musicologist. His research focuses on the life and work of the composer Robert Schumann, music history of the 18th and 19th centuries, Ludwig van Beethoven's works, compositional creative processes as well as methodology, theory and practice of music philology, in particular genetic textual criticism and digital music edition. In addition, Appel deals with the history of the viola da gamba.

== Publications ==
=== Books ===
- Robert Schumann's Humoreske für Klavier Op.20. Zum musikalischen Humor in der ersten Hälfte des 19. Jahrhunderts unter besonderer Berücksichtigung des Formproblems, Dissertation, maschr., Saarbrücken 1981.
- Robert Schumanns "Album für die Jugend". Einführung und Kommentar. Mit einem Geleitwort von Peter Härtling, Zürich, Mainz 1998, Schott, Mainz amon others 2010, ISBN 978-3-7957-8746-2.
- Musik und Szene. Festschrift für Werner Braun zum 75. Geburtstag, edited by Bernhard R. Appel, Karl W. Geck and Herbert Schneider, Saarbrücker Druckerei und Verlag, Saarbrücken 2001, ISBN 3-930843-66-8.
- Neue Bahnen. Robert Schumann und seine musikalischen Zeitgenossen (Reihe: Schumann-Forschungen. Volume 7), edited by Bernhard R. Appel, Mainz 2002, ISBN 978-3-7957-0429-2.
- Viola da gamba, Baryton, Arpeggione. Festschrift for Alfred Lessing, Düsseldorf 2000, edited by Bernhard R. Appel and Johannes Boer, Utrecht 2003.
- Robert Schumann in Endenich (1854–1856). Krankenakten, Briefzeugnisse und zeitgenössische Berichte (Schumann-Forschungen, volume 11), Schott, Mainz 2006, ISBN 3-7957-0527-4.
- Von der Nullten bis zur Zehnten. Wege zu Beethovens Symphonien, edited by Michael Ladenburger and Bernhard R. Appel (Veröffentlichungen des Beethoven-Hauses Bonn, Begleitpublikationen zu Ausstellungen, volume 19), Verlag Beethoven-Haus, Carus-Verlag, Bonn 2008, ISBN 978-3-88188-113-5.
- Vom Einfall zum Werk – Robert Schumanns Schaffensweise (Schumann-Forschungen, volume 13), Verlag Schott, Mainz 2010, ISBN 978-3-7957-0683-8.
- Editionsrichtlinien Musik. Im Auftrag der Fachgruppe Freie Forschungsinstitute in der Gesellschaft für Musikforschung edited by Bernhard R. Appel and Joachim Veit unter Mitarbeit von A. Landgraf. Bärenreiter, Kassel/ Basel among others 2000, ISBN 3-7618-1487-9.
- Ludwig van Beethoven. Diabelli Variations about a waltz by Anton Diabelli for piano Op.120. 1st part: Faksimile des Autographs NE 294 im Beethoven-Haus Bonn, 2nd part: Faksimile der Originalausgabe (Widmungsexemplar) und Kommentare von Bernhard R. Appel, William Kinderman and Michael Ladenburger, Bonn 2010 (Veröffentlichungen des Beethoven-Hauses, Reihe III: Ausgewählte Handschriften in Faksimile-Ausgaben, volumes 18/19), Bonn 2010, ISBN 978-3-88188-119-7.
- Musikphilologie. Grundlagen – Methoden – Praxis. Edited by Reinmar Emans and Bernhard R. Appel, Verlag Laaber, Laaber (Oberpfalz) 2014, ISBN 978-3-89007-723-9.
- Widmungen bei Haydn und Beethoven: Personen – Strategien – Praktiken. Bericht über den Internationalen musikwissenschaftlichen Kongress Bonn, 29. September bis 1. Oktober 2011, edited by Bernhard R. Appel, Armin Raab (Veröffentlichungen des Beethoven-Hauses Bonn, Reihe IV: Schriften zur Beethoven-Forschung, edited by Bernhard R. Appel, volume 25), Bonn 2016, ISBN 978-3-88188-146-3.
- Beethoven liest. Edited by Bernhard R. Appel and Julia Ronge (Schriften zur Beethoven-Forschung, edited by Christine Siegert, volume 28), Bonn 2016, ISBN 978-3-88188-150-0.

=== Articles ===
- Abweichungstypen in Abschriften und Drucken, in Robert Schumann und die französische Romantik. Bericht über das 5. Internationale Schumann-Symposion am 9./10. Juni 1994 in Düsseldorf, edited by Ute Bär, Mainz 1997, p. 275–293 (Schumann Forschungen, volume 6).
- Robert Schumanns Mondnacht Op.39/5– Quellen und Varianten, in Festschrift Walter Wiora zum 90. Geburtstag (30 December 1996), edited by Christoph-Hellmut Mahling and Ruth Seiberts, Tutzing 1997, p. 9–23.
- Kontamination oder wechselseitige Erhellung der Quellen?, in Der Text im musikalischen Werk: Editionsprobleme aus musikwissenschaftlicher und literaturwissenschaftlicher Sicht, edited by Walther Dürr, Helga Lühning, Norbert Oellers, Hartmut Steinecke, Berlin 1998, p. 22–42 (Beihefte zur Zeitschrift für Deutsche Philologie, 8), ISBN 978-3-503-03789-6.
- Zum Textstatus von Kompositions–Skizzen und -Entwürfen, in Jahrbuch des Staatl. Instituts für Musikforschung – Preuß. Kulturbesitz, Stuttgart / Weimar 1999, p. 177–210.
- Robert Schumann und die Komponistin Elise Müller, in "Neue Bahnen". Robert Schumann und seine musikalischen Zeitgenossen, edited by Bernhard R. Appel, Mainz 2002, p. 41–57.
- Historische Notenorthographie als editorisches Problem, in: Aspekte historischer und systematischer Musikforschung. Zur Symphonie im 19. Jahrhundert, zu Fragen der Musiktheorie, der Wahrnehmung von Musik und Anderes. Edited by Christoph-Hellmut Mahling u. Kristina Pfarr, Are-Musik-Verlag, Mainz 2002, p. 499–515, ISBN 3-924522-11-1.
- Über die allmähliche Verfertigung musikalischer Gedanken beim Schreiben, in Musikforschung, 56th year, issue. 4, 2003, p. 347–365.
- Sechs Thesen zur genetischen Kritik kompositorischer Prozesse, in: Musiktheorie, 20th year., H. 2, 2005, p. 112–122.
- Variatio delectat – Variatio perturbat. Anmerkungen zu Varianten in der Musik, in: Varianten – Variants – Variantes, edited by Christa Jansohn and Bodo Plachta, Tübingen 2005 (Beihefte zu editio, volume 22), p. 7–24.
- Schumann und die klassische Vokalpolyphonie, in Der späte Schumann. Musik-Konzepte Sonderband, edited by Ulrich Tadday, Munich 2006, p. 117–132, ISBN 3-88377-842-7.
- Poesie und Handwerk. Robert Schumanns Schaffensweise, in Schumann-Handbuch, edited by Ulrich Tadday, Metzler, Stuttgart / Weimar, Bärenreiter, Kassel 2006, p. 140–193. ISBN 978-3-476-01671-3 (Metzler), ISBN 978-3-7618-2034-6 (Bärenreiter).
- Satzschlüsse in Beethoven's Symphony No. 8 Op. 93, in Von der Nullten bis zur Zehnten. Wege zu Beethovens Symphonien (siehe unter Bücher) Bonn 2008, p. 59–68.
- Merkmale kompositorischer Varianten, in Digitale Edition zwischen Experiment und Standardisierung. Musik – Text – Codierung, edited by Peter Stadler and Joachim Veit, Tübingen 2009, p. 23–32 (Beihefte zu editio, volume 31).
- Model and Emulation: Beethoven's Cello Sonata No. 3 and E. T. A. Hoffmann's Grand Trio, in Journal of Musicological Research, 32 (Special Issue: New Beethoven Research), No. 2–3, 2013, p. 116–131.
- Widmungsstrategien. Beethoven und die europäischen Magnaten, in Widmungen bei Haydn und Beethoven: Personen – Strategien – Praktiken (siehe unter Bücher), Bonn 2016, p. 139–170.
- Music as composed Text. Reflections on the Content and Method of the „Critique Génétique“ of Musical Works, in Genéses musicales, edited by Nicolas Donin, Almuth Grésillon, Jean-Louis Lebrave, Paris 2015, p. 35–44.
- Zur Editionsgeschichte der Werke Ludwig van Beethovens: Ein Überblick, in Musikeditionen im Wandel der Geschichte, edited by Reinmar Emans and Ulrich Krämer, Berlin, Boston 2015, p. 369–404.
- Textkategorien in kompositorischen Werkstattdokumenten, in "Ei, dem alten Herrn zoll' ich Achtung gern." Festschrift für Joachim Veit zum 60. Geburtstag, edited by Kristina Richts and Peter Stadler für den Virtuellen Forschungsverbund Edirom, Munich 2016, p. 49–58, ISBN 978-3-86906-842-8.
- Beethoven und die indische Geisteswelt, in Beethoven liest (siehe unter Bücher), Bonn 2016, p. 35–58.
- Categorie testuali nei documenti di lavoro die compositori (Traduzione italiana di Federica Rovelli), in Philomusica on-line, 15/2 (2016), p. 127–138.
- Genetische Textkritik: Vom mehrfachen Schriftsinn musikalischer Werkstattdokumente, in Brahms am Werk. Konzepte, Texte, Prozesse, edited by Siegfried Oechsle and Michael Struck in cooperation with Katrin Eich, Munich 2016, p. 25–45.
- Textdifferenzen, in Musikphilologie. Grundlagen – Methoden – Praxis, (see at "Books"), Laaber 2017, p. 162–175.

=== Editions ===
- Robert Schumann. Der Handschuh op. post. [for mixed choir a cappella], Erstausgabe, Partitur, Schotts Chorverlag, Mainz u. a. 1988.
- Robert Schumann. Glockentürmers Töchterlein op. post. [for mixed choir a cappella], Erstausgabe, Partitur, Schott, Mainz u. a. 1988.
- Robert Schumann. Neue Ausgabe sämtlicher Werke, Bd. IV, 3, 2, Missa sacra op. 147 for mixed choir, Soli and Organ, Partitur, Schott, Mainz 1991; Orgelstimme, Schott, Mainz 1992; Klavierauszug, Schott, Mainz 1994.
- desgl.: Taschenpartitur, Edition Eulenburg, London 2009.
- Robert Schumann. Neue Ausgabe sämtlicher Werke, Bd. IV, 3, 3, Requiem op. 148, Partitur, Schott, Mainz 1993.
- desgl.: Taschenpartitur, Edition Eulenburg, London 2009.
- Robert Schumann. Tragödie für Solostimmen und Orchester, Erstausgabe, Schott, London / Mainz 1994.
- Robert Schumann. Klavierkonzert a-Moll. Opus 54. Faksimile der autographen Partitur, edited by Heinrich-Heine-Institut, Düsseldorf with a preface by Joseph A. Kruse and Akio Mayeda and an introduction by Bernhard R. Appel, Kassel 1996 (Dokumenta musicologica, XXVIII).
- Robert Schumann. Klavierbüchlein für Marie. Faksimile-Ausgabe der Handschrift im Beethoven-Haus Bonn mit einem Kommentar, Bonn 1998; 2. verbesserte Aufl. Bonn 2012, ISBN 978-3-88188-011-4.
- Robert Schumann. Neue Ausgabe sämtlicher Werke, VII, 3, 4, Studien und Skizzen. [...] Taschennotizbuch, edited by Bernhard R. Appel, Kazuko Ozawa-Müller and Matthias Wendt, Schott, Mainz. 1998.
- Robert Schumann. Requiem für gemischten Chor und Orchester, op. 148. Klavierauszug nach R. Schumann, Neue Ausgabe sämtlicher Werke volume IV, 3,3, Schott, Mainz among others. 1999, ISMN M-001-123377-8.
- Robert Schumann. Neue Ausgabe sämtlicher Werke. Serie III: Klavier- und Orgelwerke, Werkgruppe 2: Werke für Klavier zu vier Händen bzw. für zwei Klaviere, edited by Joachim Draheim and Bernhard R. Appel, Schott, Mainz among others 2001, ISMN M-001-11317-5.
- Robert Schumann. Neue Ausgabe sämtlicher Werke, Werkgruppe II, vol. 1, Klavierkonzert Op. 54, edited by Bernhard R. Appel, Schott, Mainz among others 2003.
- Robert Schumann: Andante und Variationen op. 46, Urtext nach der Gesamtausgabe für zwei Klaviere zu vier Händen, edited by Bernhard R. Appel and Joachim Draheim, Schott, Mainz / London 2005, ISMN M-001-13998-4.
- Robert Schumann. Neue Ausgabe sämtlicher Werke. Serie I: Orchesterwerke, Werkgruppe 2: Konzerte, vol. 2: [...] Anhang: Konzertsatz d-moll Anhang B5, Schott, Mainz / London among others 2007, ISBN 978-3-7957-9320-3.
- Robert Schumann: Konzert für Klavier und Orchester op. 54. Klavierauszug, Schott, Mainz / London among others 2010, ISMN 979-0-001-17133-5.
- Robert Schumann. Neue Ausgabe sämtlicher Werke. Serie VII: Klavierauszüge, Bearbeitungen, Studien und Skizzen, Werkgruppe 3: Studien und Skizzen: vol. 3, 2: Brautbuch Anhang R11, Schott, Mainz / London 2011, ISMN 979-0-001-17421-3.
