= Olga Loseva =

Russian musicologist

Olga Vladimirovna Loseva (born 18 November 1954) is a Russian musicologist. She works as a lecturer in music theory at the Moscow Tchaikovsky Conservatory.

== Career ==
Loseva received her doctorate in 1987 with a thesis on Robert Schumann's late work. In addition to essays on this composer, she wrote the book Clara und Robert Schumann in St. Petersburg und Moskau im Jahr 1844, which was published in Russian and German. According to the city of Zwickau, Loseva thus continued the work of the late Schumann researcher Daniel Zhitomirsky, who received the Robert Schumann Prize of the City of Zwickau in 1966.

== Awards ==
For her Schumann works, Loseva was awarded the 2000 Robert Schumann Prize.
