= Schumann House, Leipzig =

Schumann House
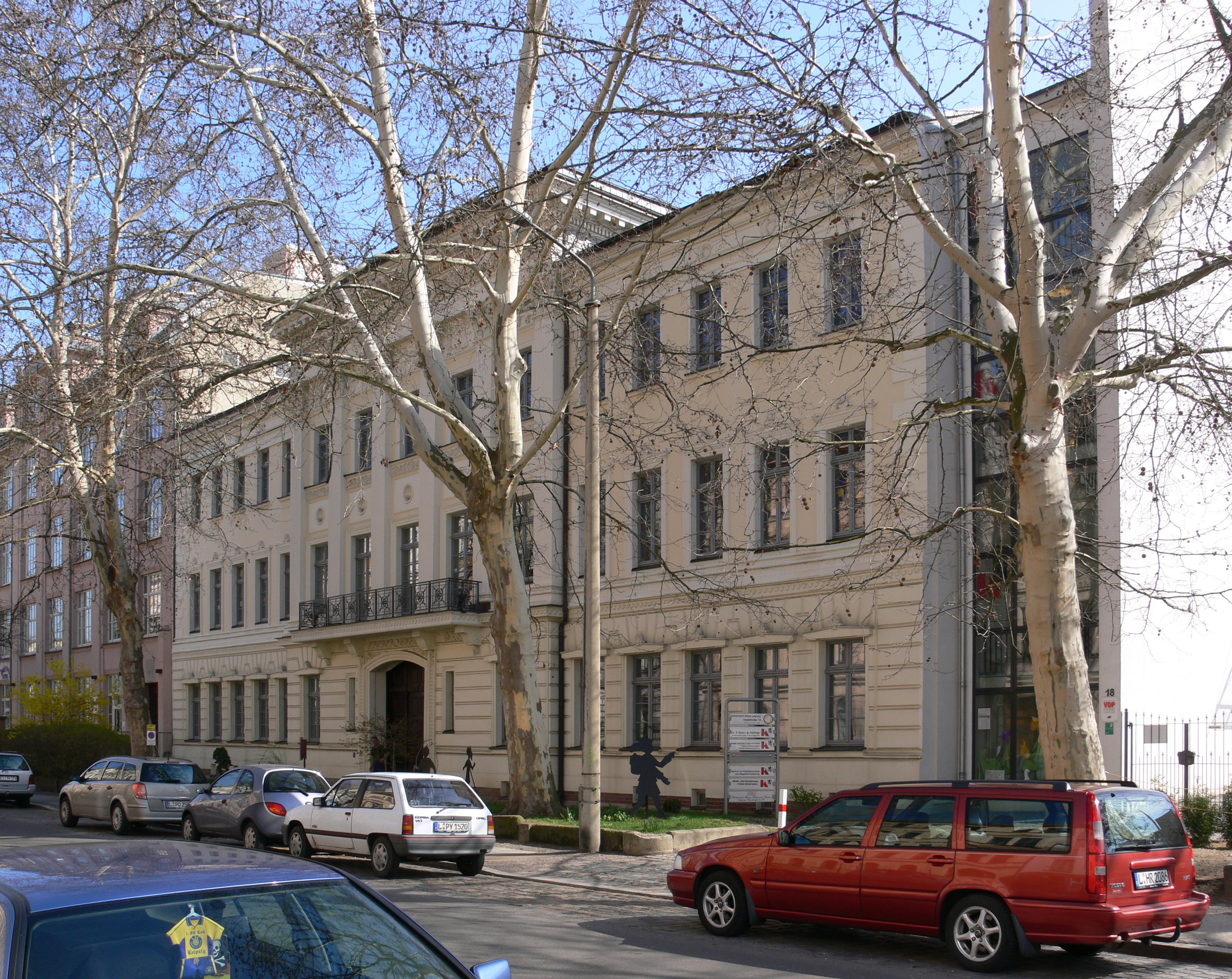
- Interactive map of the Schumann House area

General information
- Architectural style: Neoclassical
- Location: Inselstraße 18; 04103 Leipzig, Germany
- Coordinates: 51°20′25.8″N 12°23′28″E

Website
- https://www.schumannhaus.de/en/

The Schumann House is a cultural site in Leipzig in Germany. The musicians Robert Schumann and his wife Clara lived here for their first four years of marriage; there are now exhibition rooms in their former apartment, about their life and work.

== Background ==
The building was constructed, in Neoclassical style, by Friedrich August Schiedel in 1838. Robert and Clara Schumann, after their marriage in September 1840, lived here until 1844 in an apartment on the first floor.

Guests the Schumanns received here include Felix Mendelssohn, Franz Liszt and Hector Berlioz. Works composed by Robert Schumann during this period include the Spring Symphony, the three String Quartets and the Piano Quintet.

== Exhibition ==
The building, apart from the exhibition rooms on the first floor, is now the independent primary school "Clara Schumann". Among the exhibition rooms are the Schumann Salon, where the Schumanns received guests; the Travel Room, which is concerned with concert tours to Denmark in 1842 and Russia in 1844; and the Sound Room (Klangraum), designed in the style of the Biedermeier period, which contains an interactive sound installation by the artist Erwin Stache.

== See also ==
- Robert Schumann House
- Lindenmuseum Clara Schumann
