= Elisabeth Breul =

German opera singer and singing teacher (1930–2016)

Elisabeth Breul (25 August 1930 – 12 October 2016) was a German operatic soprano and singing teacher.

== Life and career ==
Born in Gera, Breul first studied at the Musikhochschule in Gera with Marta-Luise Fink and then at the Hochschule für Musik Carl Maria von Weber in Dresden with Klara Elfriede Intrau. From 1960 to 1992, she was a Member of the Leipzig Opera as lyric soprano. On the basis of guest contracts she also worked at the Staatsoper Dresden and the Komische Oper Berlin. Breul had international appearances at la Monnaie in Brussels, at the operas of Brünn, Łódź, Budapest and Genoa. In the music centres of Romania, France, Spain and the USSR she also performed as a guest in concert halls.

In 1970 Breul received the National Prize of the German Democratic Republic and in 1972 the Robert Schumann Prize of the City of Zwickau. From 1962 Breul worked as a music teacher at the Hochschule für Musik Carl Maria von Weber in Dresden and Hochschule für Musik und Theater "Felix Mendelssohn Bartholdy" Leipzig. In 1977 she was appointed professor in Dresden and in 1982 in Leipzig. Breul has been an honorary member of the Leipzig Opera since 1992. On stage, she sang mostly lyrical roles. As a concert singer she performed in particular with Bach- and Handel-Repertoire.

Breul died in Leipzig at age 86.
