= Ragna Schirmer =

German pianist

- Born: 1972 (age 53–54); Hildesheim, Lower Saxony, West Germany
- Education: Hochschule für Musik und Theater Hannover
- Occupations: Pianist; Academic teacher
- Organizations: Hochschule für Musik und Darstellende Kunst Mannheim
- Awards: International Johann Sebastian Bach Competition
- Website: www.ragnaschirmer.de

Ragna Schirmer (born 1972) is a German classical pianist and academic teacher. She is focused on the music of Johann Sebastian Bach, and won the International Johann Sebastian Bach Competition twice.

== Life ==
Born in Hildesheim, Schirmer studied with Karl-Heinz Kämmerling at the Hochschule für Musik und Theater Hannover from 1991. In 1993, she continued her studies in Paris with Bernard Ringeissen. She earned her diploma with top marks in 1995 and completed her soloist training with a concert exam in 1999. Since then, she has taken part in several master classes. From 2001 to 2011 Schirmer was professor of piano at the Hochschule für Musik und Darstellende Kunst Mannheim, and today promotes young talents in Halle.

Schirmer received a scholarship from both Deutscher Musikrat and the Studienstiftung des Deutschen Volkes. She is the only pianist to have won the International Johann Sebastian Bach Competition in Leipzig twice, in 1992 and 1998. As her first CD, she released a recording of Bach's Goldberg Variations in 2000. This and other CDs have received awards in professional music journals. She was named artist in residence in Heidelberg in 2010. In 2012, she was honoured with the Handel Prize of Halle, and in 2019, she was co-recipient of the Robert Schumann Prize of the City of Zwickau, alongside musicologist Janina Klassen.
