= Gisela Schäfer =

German internist (1924–2021)

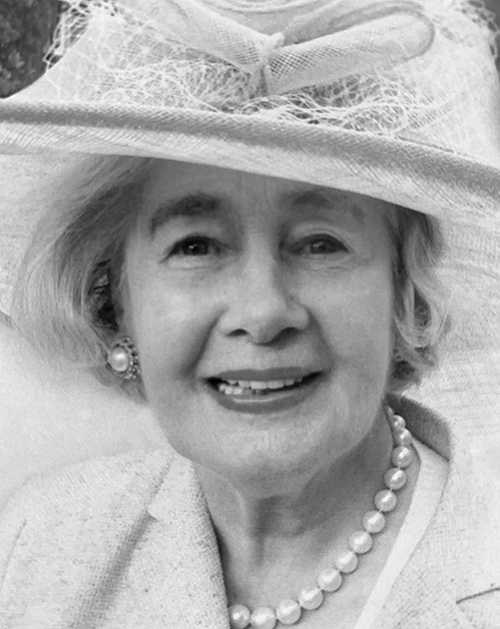
Gisela Schäfer 2013

Gisela Schäfer née Rausch (* 23 July 1924 – † 23 March 2021 in Düsseldorf) was a German internist. On her initiative, the Robert Schumann Society was founded on 20 March 1979 in Düsseldorf.

In 1992 Schäfer was awarded the Robert Schumann Prize of the City of Zwickau. In 1994, the first Concours Clara Schumann for piano, founded by Schäfer, took place in Düsseldorf. On 26 March 1999, Schäfer received the Order of Merit of the Federal Republic of Germany for her many years of cultural work for the city of Düsseldorf as "Robert Schumann City". In 2002, Schäfer was appointed honorary chairman of the Robert Schumann Society Düsseldorf together with the long-standing chairman of the board Herbert Zapp.
