= Hans Joachim Köhler =

German musicologist

Hans Joachim Köhler (born in 1936) is a German musicologist.

Born in Leipzig, Köhler studied music education and English at the Martin-Luther-University Halle-Wittenberg. At first, he worked as an assistant at the University of Greifswald but in 1963 he moved to the University of Leipzig. He worked mainly in the field of artistic practice. In 1979 he became a lecturer and in 1992 he was appointed professor for music pedagogy in Leipzig. In 1999 he became emeritus professor.

As a Leipzig Schumann researcher, he published the 30-volume original text edition of Robert Schumann's piano works at Edition Peters. In addition to numerous articles on aesthetic and biographical aspects of Robert and Clara Schumann, he published two monographs on Schumann's works:

- Alltag und Kunst – Das Domizil der Schumanns in der Leipziger Inselstraße, Altenburg, 2004 (Kamprad Verlag)
- Robert und Clara Schumann – Ein Lebensbogen, Altenburg 2006 (Kamprad Verlag)

In 1978, Köhler won the Robert Schumann Prize of the City of Zwickau.
