= Janina Klassen =

German musicologist (born 1953)

Janina Klassen (born in 1953) is a German musicologist and professor emerita at the Hochschule für Musik Freiburg.

== Life and career ==
Born in Bad Salzuflen, Klassen studied musicology, German studies, philosophy and Italian in Freiburg im Breisgau, Vienna, Paris, Siena and Kiel. She first worked at Christians Verlag in Hamburg and as a lecturer for music theory. After various engagements and teaching positions as well as freelance work as an author, dramaturge and publisher, she earned her doctorate at Kiel University in 1988 with her doctoral thesis on "Clara Wieck-Schumann – the virtuoso as composer". The topic of her habilitation at the Technische Universität Berlin was rhetorical figures in music in the context of writings from the 16th to the 18th centuries.

From 1999 to 2022 she has been professor of musicology at the Hochschule für Musik Freiburg and a member of the Senate there. She has published articles on current music and music concepts, music-historical topics, music language theory, listening theories, and gender issues. In 2009 she wrote an authoritative biography of Clara Schumann.

== Prizes ==
- Prize of the faculty, Christian-Albrechts-University Kiel for her dissertation
- Robert Schumann Prize of the City of Zwickau 2019 (together with Ragna Schirmer).
