= Eva Fleischer =

German opera singer

Eva Fleischer, also Eva Fleischer-Fischer (5 May 1922 in Wrocław – 8 January 2016 in Leipzig) was a German opera contralto and professor at the University of Music and Theatre Leipzig.

== Life ==
Born in Breslau, Fleischer studied at the Musikhochschule Leipzig, where she became a lecturer in 1951. From 1959 to 1966 she belonged to the ensemble of the Leipzig Opera. In the 1960s she was the subject of several oil paintings by Bernhard Heisig. From 1966 to 1982 she was professor at the Musikhochschule Leipzig.

She was married to the pianist Rudolf Fischer.

Fleischer died in Leipzig at age 93.

== Awards ==
- 2nd Prize in the Singing category of the International Johann Sebastian Bach Competition 1950
- Nationalpreis der DDR III. Klasse für Kunst und Literatur 1958 ("for her interpretation of German and international classical and progressive songs, expressing her commitment to our State and to the construction of socialism".)
- Robert Schumann Prize of the City of Zwickau (1983).
