= Lindenmuseum Clara Schumann =

Museum in Schmorsdorf, Saxony, Germany

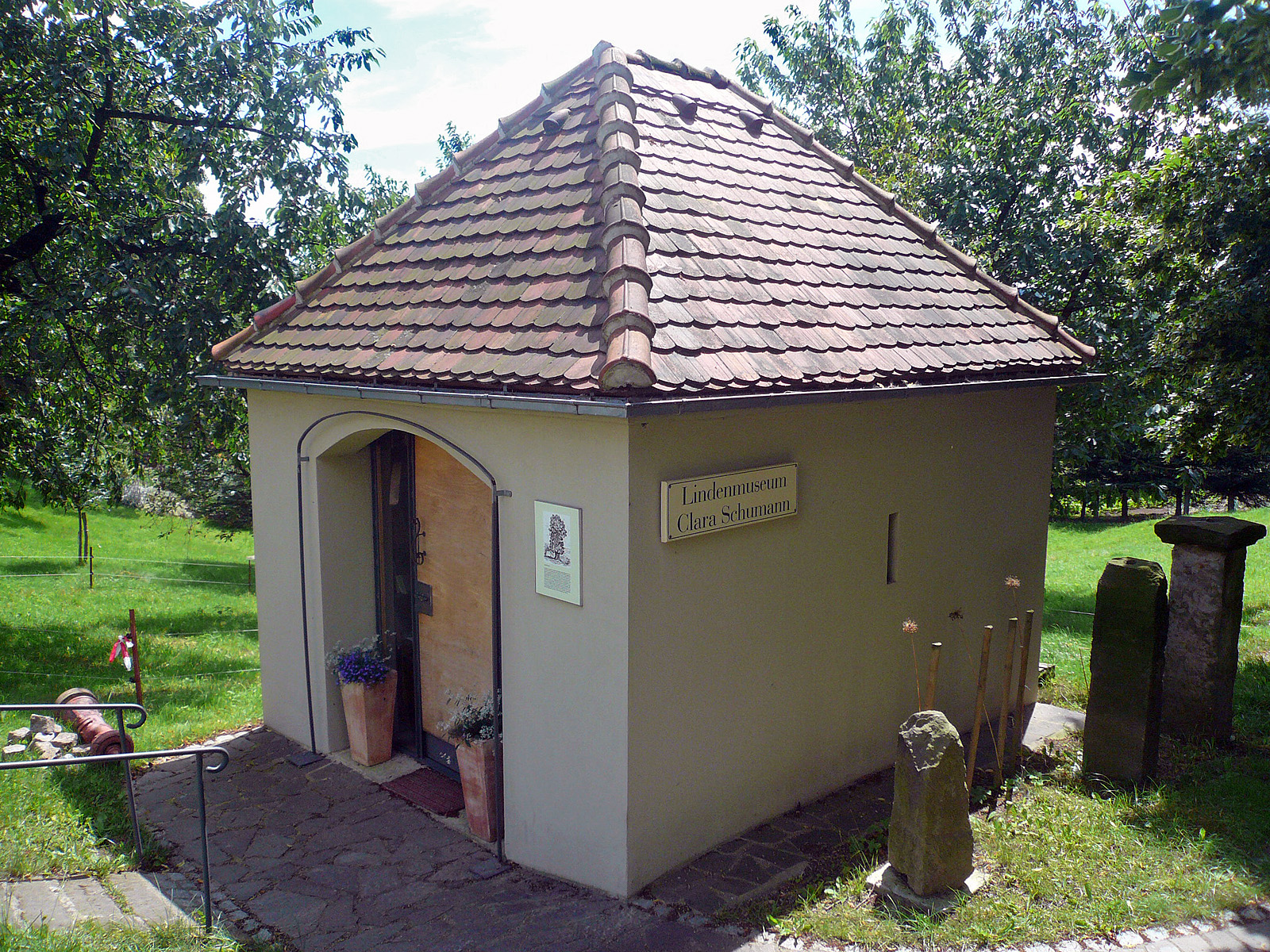
- Interactive map of the Lindenmuseum Clara Schumann area

General information
- Location: Müglitztal, Saxony, Germany
- Coordinates: 50°55′52″N 13°49′14″E
- Opened: May 2006

Website
- Lindenmuseum Clara Schumann

Lindenmuseum Clara Schumann is a small museum in Schmorsdorf, in the municipality of Müglitztal, near Dresden in Saxony, Germany. It is dedicated to the pianist and composer Clara Schumann, wife of the composer Robert Schumann.

== Description ==
Schloss Maxen, in the nearby village of Maxen, was the home of Friedrich Anton Serre (1789–1863), a retired major, and his wife. They were friends of Clara's father Friedrich Wieck. When Clara stayed with the Serres, she used to visit a famous centuries-old lime tree, known as the Schmorsdorf lime tree.

The museum, built next to the tree, was opened in May 2006. Its area is 6.5 square metres (70 sq ft). There are displays about lime trees and in particular the Schmorsdorf lime tree; and about Schloss Maxen and Clara Schumann's relation with the village.

== See also ==
- Schumann House, Leipzig
- Robert Schumann House
