= Gertraud Geißler =

German classical pianist

Gertraud Geißler is a German pianist and university lecturer for piano playing and co-repetition at the Hochschule für Musik Carl Maria von Weber Dresden. In 1978 she won the Robert Schumann Prize of the City of Zwickau.

Geisler gave several concerts with Trakl poems set to music by Paul Kurzbach, e.g. on the occasion of the hundredth birthday of this composer in the year 2002. She had already recorded with other artists and the composer himself these Trakl settings in 1987.

== Recording ==
- Wolfgang Lesser - Ein Tag in unserer Stadt / Fünf Lieder aus dem Dreistrophenkalender von Georg Maurer / Carl-Heinz Pick - Du schwarze Erde (Label: Nova - 885099, Viny LP, 1977) with Gertraud Geißler, Karl-Heinz Stryczek, Irene Werner, Günther Leib (artist)
- Kveta Konickova (soprano), Günter Philipp (piano), Gertraud Geißler (piano) et al.: ... und in der Stille singe ich - Lieder sorbischer Komponisten (Label: Nova - 885225, Vinyl LP, 1981)
- Paul Kurzbach, Werner Zeibig, Kammerchor Der Singakademie Karl-Marx-Stadt – Kontrabass Konzert • Choir • Trakl-Lieder (Label: Nova – 885270, Vinyl LP, 1987) with Gertraud Geißler as pianist bei den Trakl-Liedernist.
