= Schmorsdorf lime tree =

Natural monument in the center of Schmorsdorf

Coordinates: 50°55′52.3″N 13°49′13.8″E

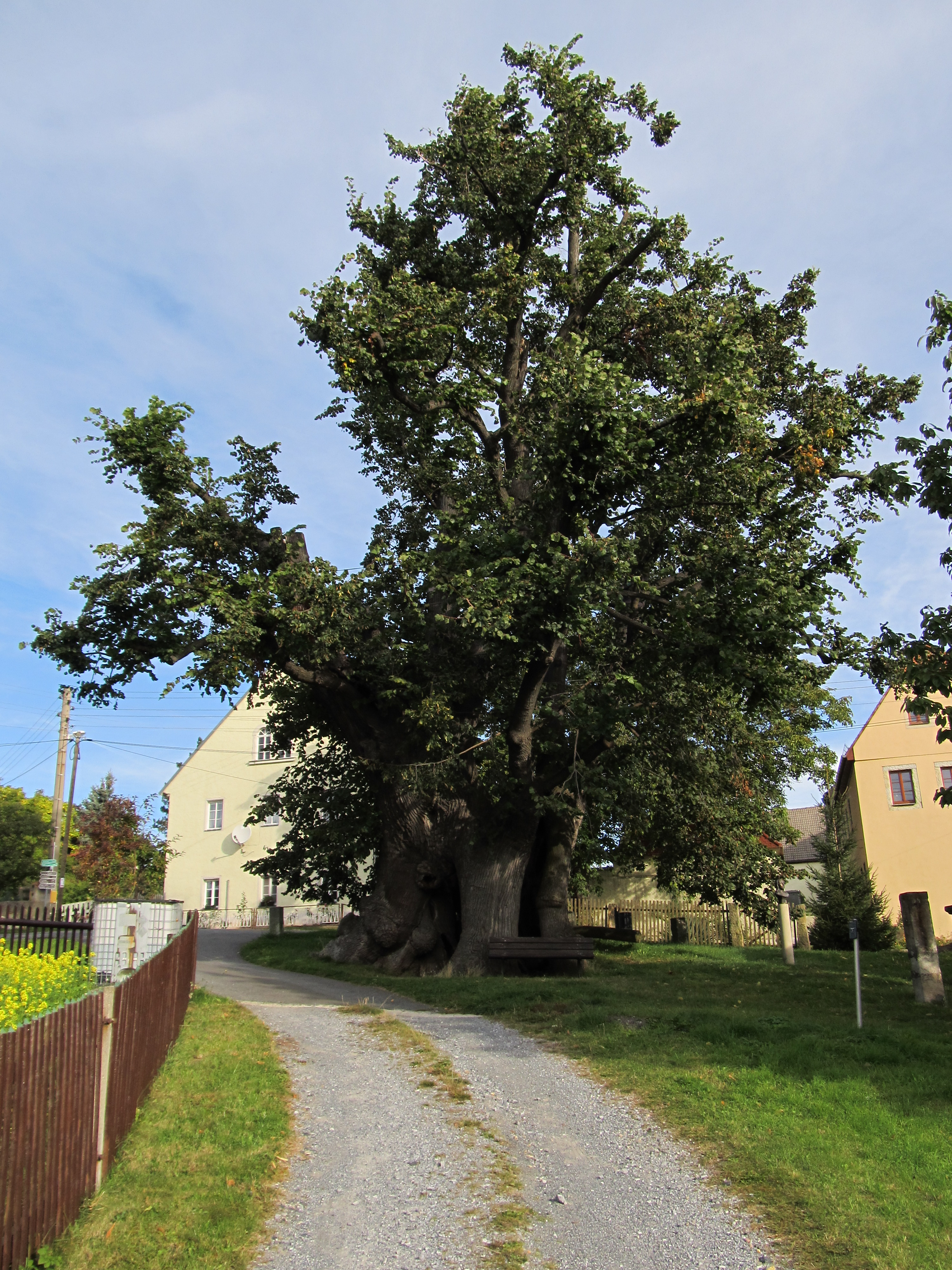
South view

The Schmorsdorf lime tree (German: Schmorsdorfer Linde) is a natural monument located in the center of Schmorsdorf, Müglitztal, in the Saxony district of Sächsische Schweiz-Osterzgebirge, Germany. This large-leaved linden (Tilia platyphyllos) is estimated to be 400 to 800 years old. The circumference of its trunk is about 11 meters, and it stands at a height of around 24 meters. The tree gained historical significance during the Thirty Years' War and was first mentioned in writing around 1630 due to its impressive size. Notably, the renowned pianist and composer Clara Schumann visited the Linden Tree multiple times between 1836 and 1849. In her honor, the Linden Museum, which opened next to the tree in 2006, was named after her and remains the only museum of its kind in Germany. The Schmorsdorf lime tree has been recognized by the Deutsche Baumarchiv (German Tree Archive) as a "National Bedeutsamen Bäumen (NBB)" (Nationally Significant Tree), with its trunk circumference serving as the primary selection criterion for this distinction.

== Location ==
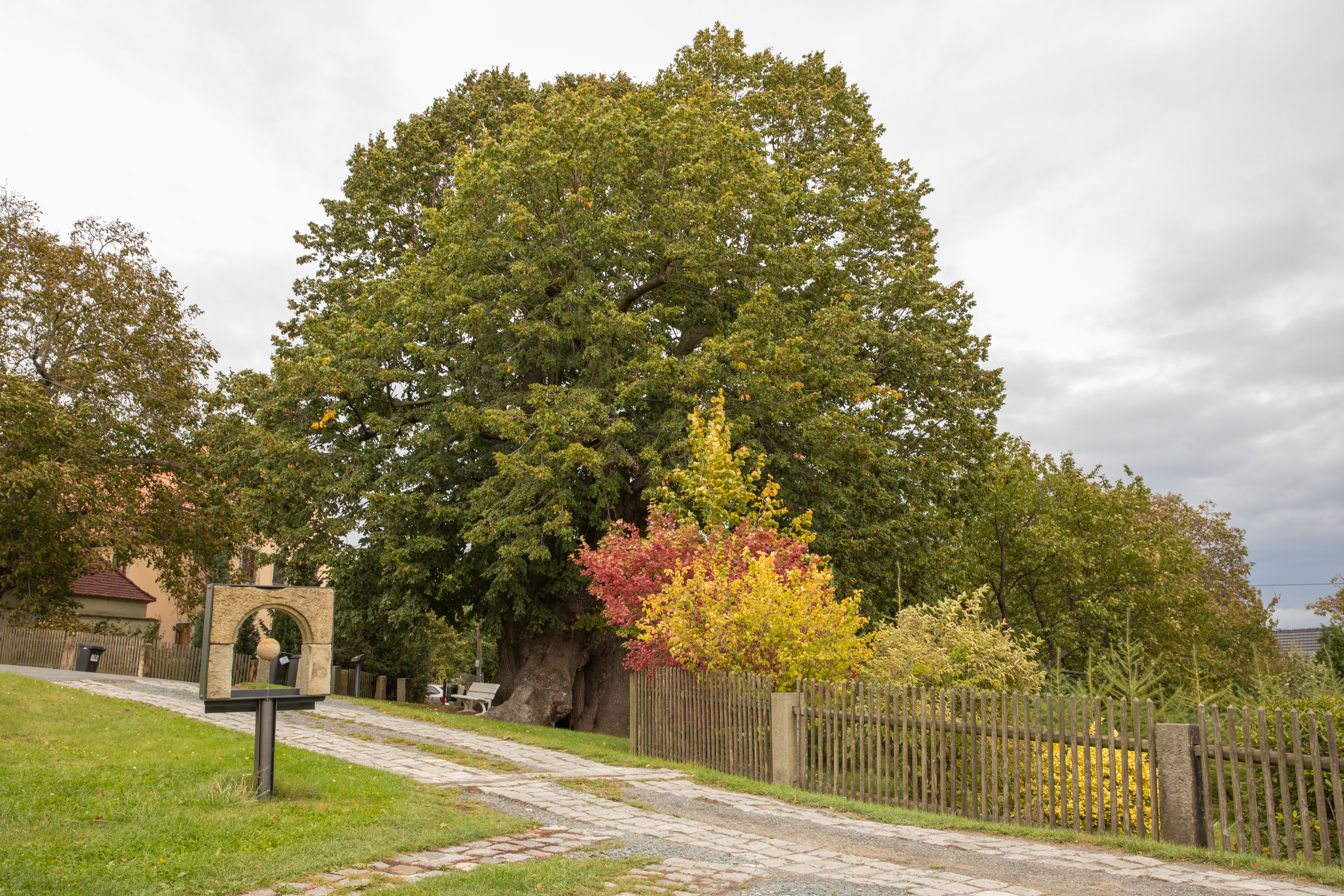
Schmorsdorf lime tree October 2021

The lime tree stands at the center of the small village of Schmorsdorf near Maxen, which was originally designed as a loosely arranged circular settlement. It is situated on a hill in the Osterzgebirge foothills, five kilometers south of Dresden's city boundaries, and rises 305 meters above sea level on a piece of grass with a slight southward slope. Adjacent to the tree, on two sides, there are benches for visitors to rest. Three sides of the Linden tree are surrounded by paths, while the fourth side is occupied by the Lindenmuseum Clara Schumann. Next to the museum are three old distance columns, known as lapidaries, and a bust of Clara Schumann created by Lungkwitz sculptor Hans Kazzer in 2008. Overhead power lines and sealed surfaces, as well as driving on the root zone, affect the location of the Linden tree.

== History ==
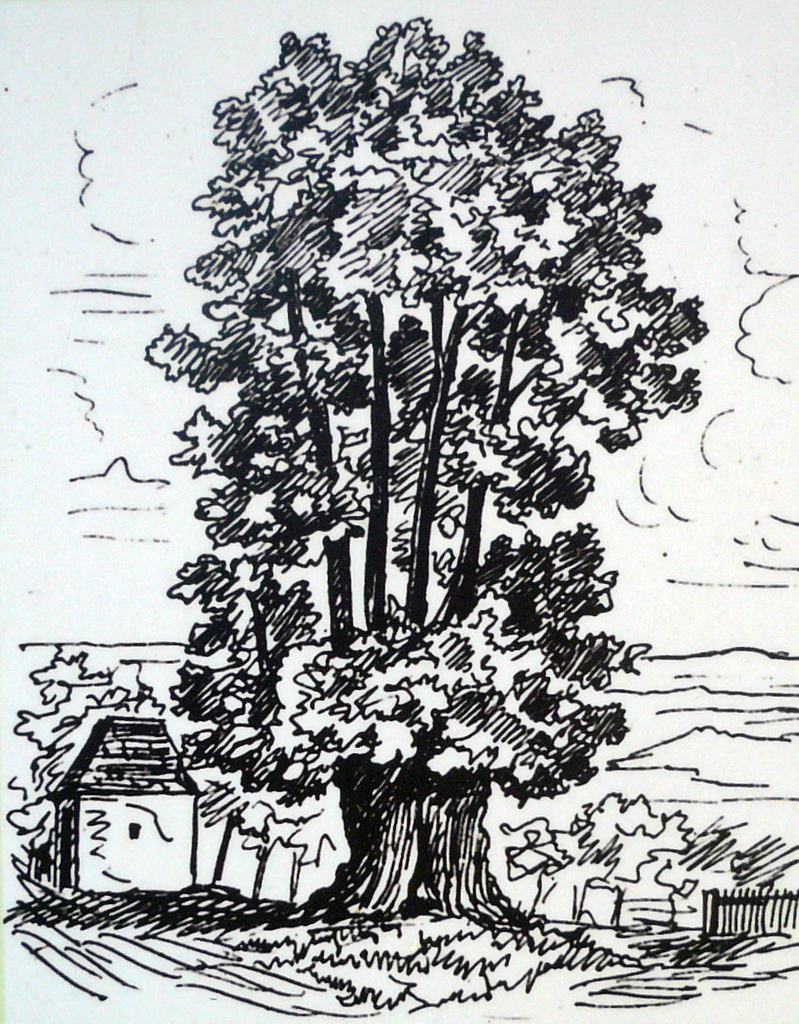
Lime Tree in Mountain Flowers (1888)

The lime tree's impressive size and shape were first mentioned in official records around 1630 during the events of the Thirty Years' War, as passing troops took note of it. It stands along a historically significant road that once served as an important connection to Dresden, frequently used by troops during the Seven Years' War and by Napoleonic soldiers in the early 19th century. Schmorsdorf gained prominence during the Seven Years' War at the Battle of Maxen, where Austrian field marshal and general Leopold Joseph von Daun captured Friedrich August von Finck on 21 November 1759. The Maxen castle of Prussian major Johann Friedrich Anton von Serre, which he acquired in 1819, was a preferred gathering place for artists from all over the world who stayed with his wife Friederike Serre in the 19th century. The renowned pianist and composer Clara Schumann (née Wieck), along with her husband Robert Schumann, stayed at Maxen Castle on several occasions between 1836 and 1849. During her time there, Clara Schumann frequently took walks around Maxen, including nighttime excursions to the Schmorsdorfer lime tree. In her diary, she wrote that a woman was said to walk around there at night.

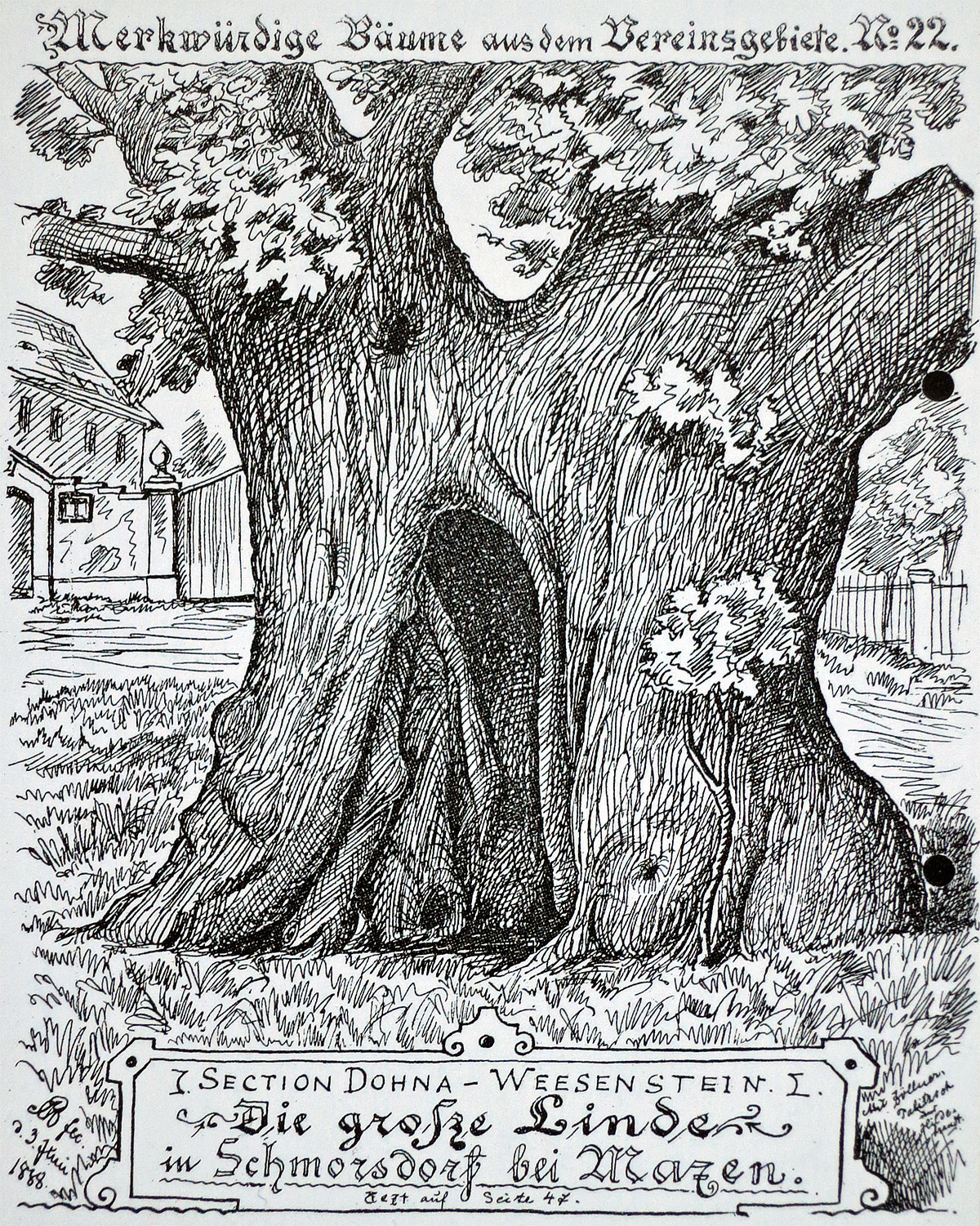
Lime Tree in Mountain Flowers (1888)

On 9 August 1873 a fire broke out in a manor house in the village, which quickly spread to neighboring houses due to strong winds. It was later discovered that the fire was deliberately set by a young boy. The lime tree also suffered damage in this fire, although there were no reported casualties, some cattle perished. On 21 January 1884, during a storm, several large branches broke off from the weakened Linden tree, which had been previously affected by the fire. Subsequently, on 3 February, the community board decided to sell four intact timbers from the tree to a lumber dealer for 50 pfennigs per cubic foot or 22 marks per cubic meter. The unusable broken wood was auctioned off as firewood on 4 February. Prior to the storm, the crown branches had been held together by a heavy ship's chain, which was also sold after the storm event. It is said that the lime tree reached a height of 44 meters before the storm, as measured by Hermann Schneider. Some sources suggest that the storm followed the destructive fire of 1884, which reportedly destroyed half of the village. However, there are no records of another fire occurring in 1873. There is a plaque on a rebuilt building from 1874, commemorating the events of 9 August 1873, when the flames consumed property and belongings, but through God's mercy, the community was spared. The inscription reads: "By God's help in mercy, erb. C.F.A. Sänger 1874." In the journal of the Dresden Historical Society in 1888, the height of the lime tree was documented as 30 meters. At ground level, the trunk had a circumference of 15.25 meters, which was reduced to 10 meters at a height of 1.5 meters. The lime tree is described there as an old tree that burned out when struck by lightning but remained vital. In 1888, the lime tree was also depicted in the illustrated sheets of Bergblumen (Mountain flowers), a publication by the Strehlen section of the Mountain Club for Saxon-Bohemian Switzerland, founded in 1877. Additionally, in 1892, the magazine ‚Die Gartenlaube featured it in the series Deutschlands merkwürdige Bäume ( Remarkable trees in Germany):

"It is an ancient gray lime tree that distinguishes itself from the peculiar trees in Germany. Located south of the Elbe Valley, between Dresden and Saxon Switzerland, near the border of the Ore Mountains, lie the villages of Schmorsdorf and Maxen. These villages are famous for the Battle of Maxen, a significant event during the Seven Years' War, where Austrian Field Marshal Daun captured Prussian General Fink on 21 September 1759. A hill between the two villages is still known as 'Finkenfang'. This region holds historical importance and is marked by remnants of the former Wendish settlement of the "Sorbenwenden". Some linguists suggest that the name Schmorsdorf itself is derived from the Wendish word smorden meaning 'thresher'. Near Schmorsdorf, there is a lime tree, which stands out because of its peculiar shape. While its exact age is unknown, it can be traced back to the Wendish period. Its growth is astonishing, with the main trunk, measuring 9 meters in circumference at its thinnest point, rising 5 meters above the ground and then dividing into a series of branches, that extend up to 40 meters into the sky. Inside the hollow interior of the trunk, there is enough space for 12 to 15 people, and according to tradition, the municipal court used to hold meetings within it. Unfortunately, in 1884, a fire engulfed the Linden tree, causing significant damage to half of the village. Subsequently, a strong gust of wind tore off the three most severely affected trunks. However, the tree has rejuvenated through new growth, and it is our hope that this ancient giant will continue to stand tall, captivating the admiration of future generations."

— The gazebo, 1892

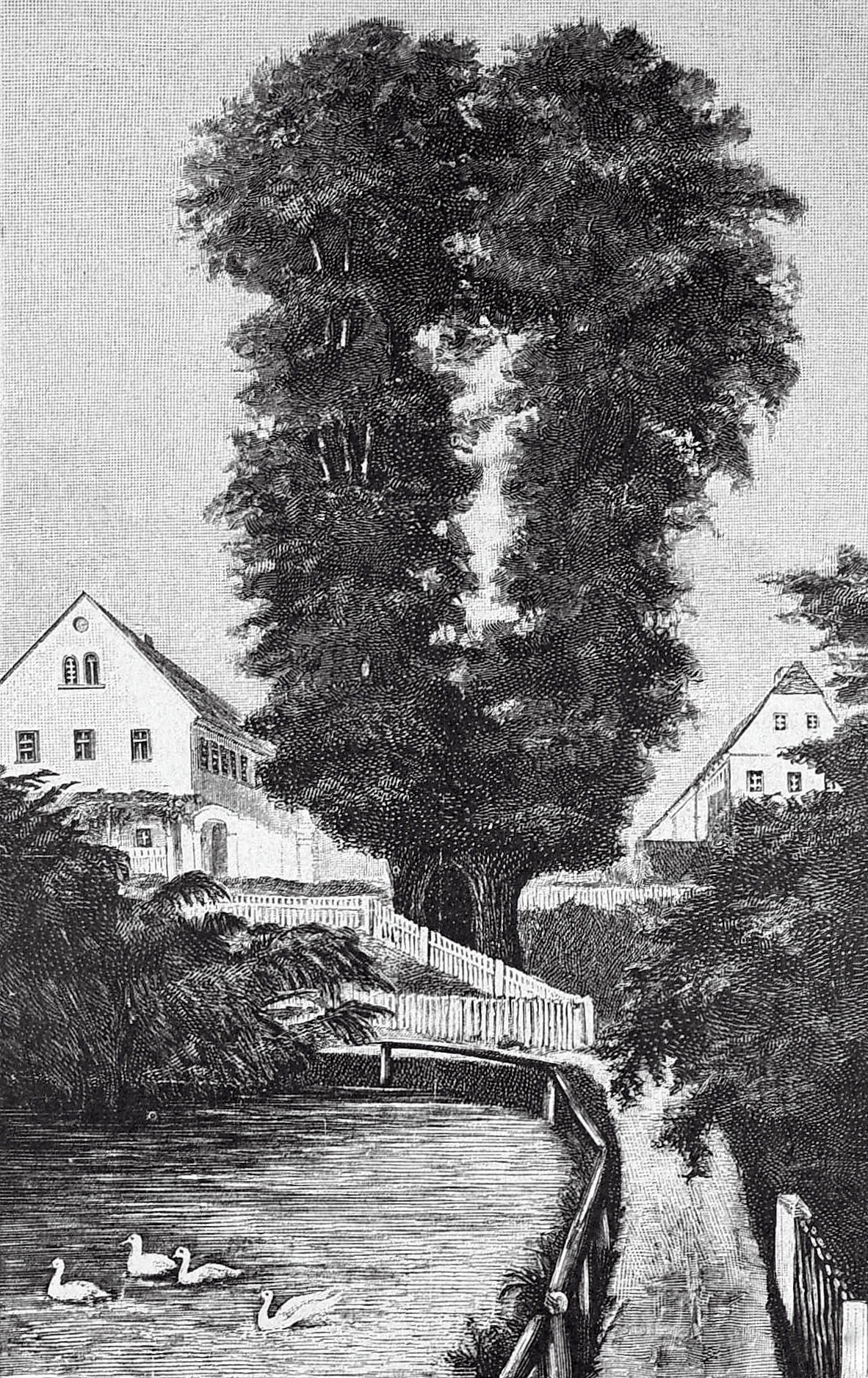
Lime Tree in The Gazebo (1892)

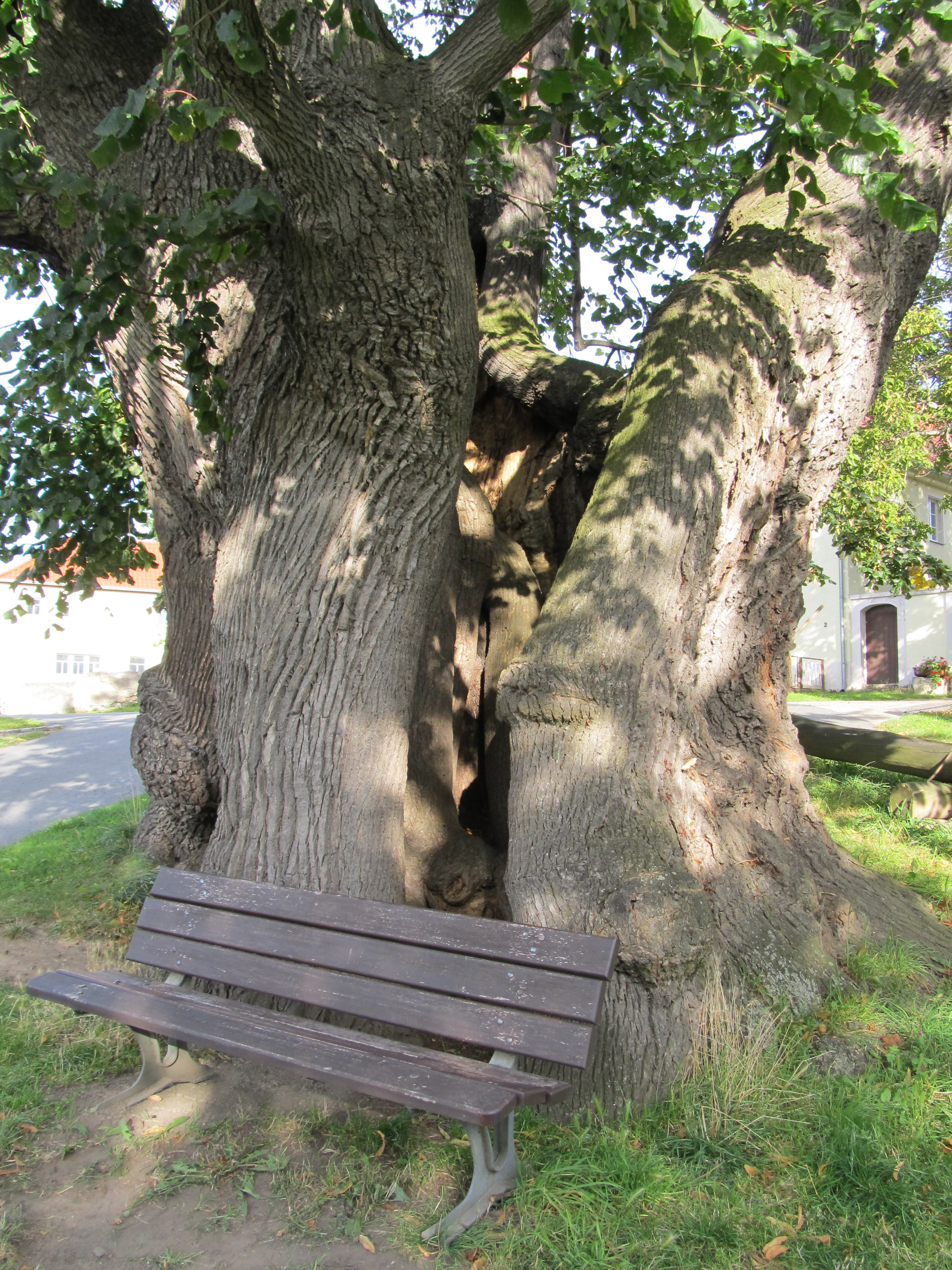
Open trunk from the south

In the magazine there is a picture of the Linden tree, created based on a photograph taken by Th. Kirsten in Dresden. Additionally, the local museum of Maxen has an artistically oil painted picture, based on the same photograph. The picture is supposed to show the lime tree before the storm event of 1884. However, some sources describe the image as depicting the tree's condition after the 1884 event. A photograph from around 1900 shows that half of the tree's crown consisted of shorter, young branches. According to the mountain club Über Berg und Tal's logbook, on 7 May 1911, 40 members of the Society for Saxon History hiked from Malter to Ploschwitz via Reinhardtsgrimma and Maxen, via the Schmorsdorf lime tree.

On 31 July 1939 the lime tree was officially designated as a natural monument under the Reich Nature Conservation Act (RNG) by the Dresden-Bautzen district government. Toward the end of World War II, Soviet troops passed by the lime tree. During a severe thunderstorm on 24 July 1957, a horizontally overhanging branch, called a bathtub and pointing south, broke off. This branch had a hollowed-out area where rainwater collected, creating a bathing spot for children. The lime tree was designated as a natural monument two more times, on 11 October 1979, by the Pirna District Council (RdK) under the number 75-12/79, and on 12 May 1988, under the number 1129-115/88. In 1991, experts performed crown protection by using wire ropes and caring for the bark. A gravel pad was placed over the root zone to provide better support for the Linden tree and a drainage system was installed. The restoration cost amounted to 8000 Marks. In 1993, representatives from the forestry office and the Schutzgemeinschaft Deutscher Wald (Protective Association of the German Forest) inspected the lime tree. They determined a crown diameter of 21 meters and estimated its age to be around 600 years. Parts of the tree crown were pruned in 1997. In 2000, the steel securing of the crown from 1991, which was proved to be too rigid, was replaced by a flexible belt system, costing 2,760 marks. In 2004, the crown was shortened to prevent it from breaking due to its excessive size. The lime tree is inspected every two years for any signs of deterioration on behalf of the district office. Since 2006, the Lindenmuseum Clara Schumann has been in close proximity to the tree.

== Description ==
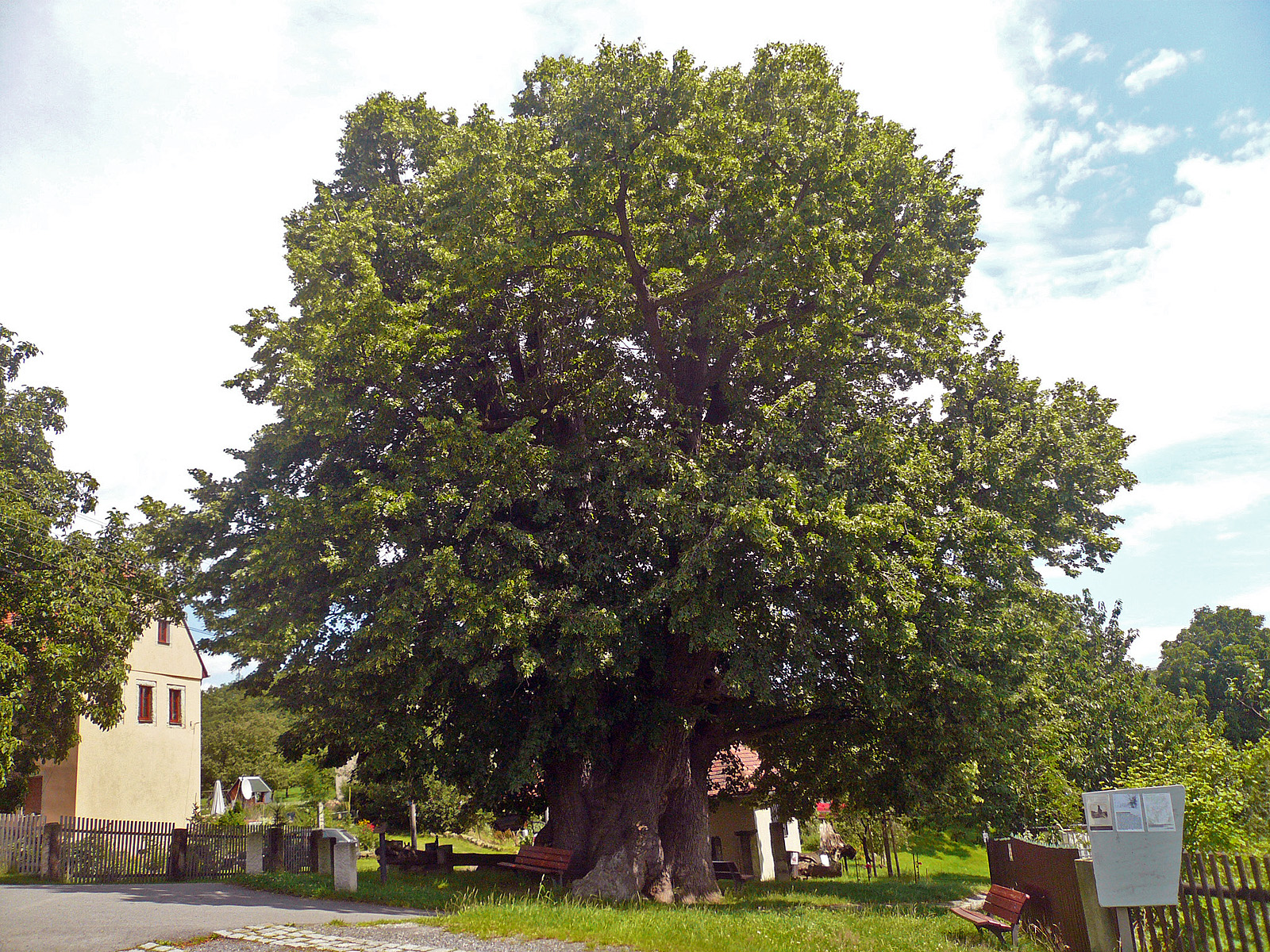
North view

The lime tree stands at approximately 24 meters in height with a crown diameter of around 20 meters. Prior to losing part of its crown in a storm in 1884, it was 44 meters high. The trunk of the tree features two gate-like openings on one side, leading to interconnected cavities that can accommodate up to 15 people. Adventitious stems have emerged in these cavities, providing nutrients to various parts of the crown. The inner walls of the trunk cavity are covered with new bark, a unique characteristic of linden trees. The trunk cavity extends into seven individual trunks. Large branches form a dense, foliage-rich crown at a height of four meters, despite the damage incurred at the end of the 19th century. The strong branches of the crown are connected to each other using a flexible belt system, ensuring the prevention of branch breakage. This dynamic securing allows for natural crown movement while gently restraining excessive motion.

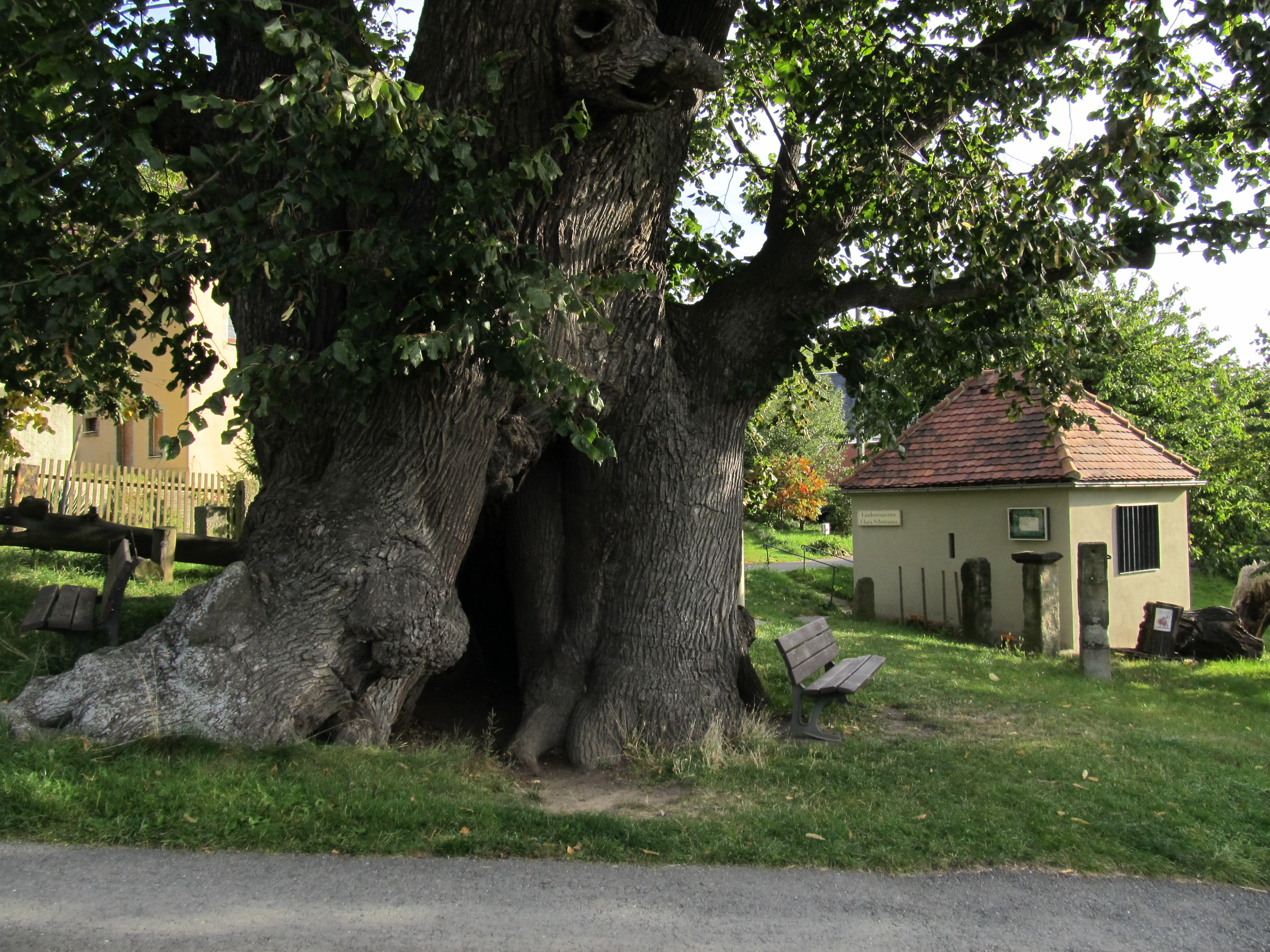
Trunk view and museum

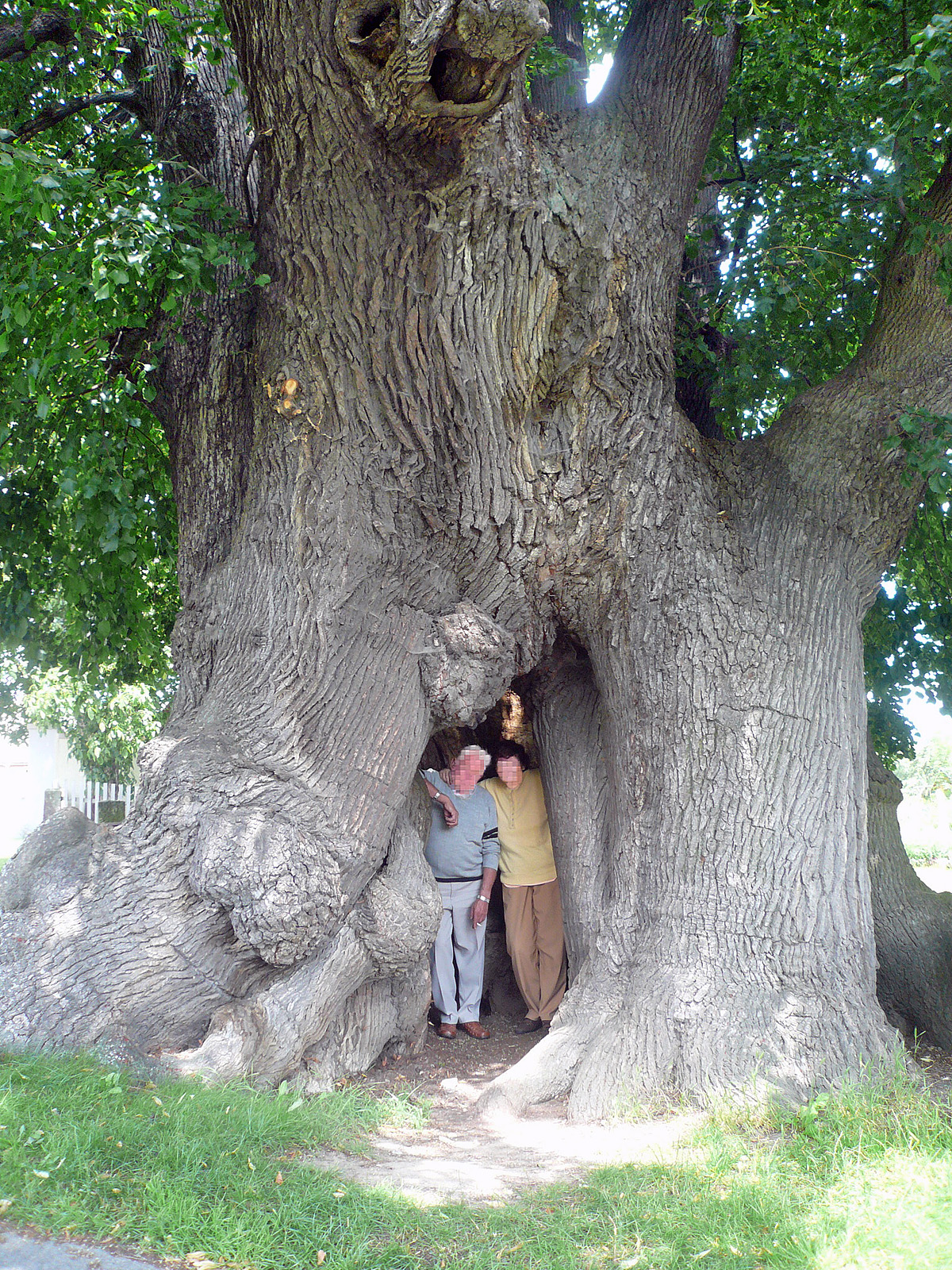
Trunk view with two people in the cavity

The tree has been measured at varied lengths over the years, yielding different circumference measurements. The circumference around the rootstock is reported to be 15.5 meters, while at a height of 1.5 meters, it measures 10.9 meters. In 1994, forest scientist Hans Joachim Fröhlich recorded a circumference of 10.70 meters at a height of 1.3 meters. Dutch forester Jeroen Pater measured a circumference of 10.50 meters in his book Europas Alte Bäume (Europe's Old Trees) published in 1999. A brochure from the Radebeul State Environmental Agency in 2004 titled Baum-Naturdenkmale in der Region oberes Elbtal/Osterzgebirge (Tree Natural Monuments in the Upper Elbe Valley/Eastern Ore Mountains Region), reported a trunk circumference of 11.15 meters. Michel Brunner gave a circumference of 11.30 meters in 2007 in his work Bedeutende Linden (Important Linden trees). In 2001, the Deutsche Baumarchiv (German Tree Archive) determined a circumference of 10.46 at the point of the smallest diameter (waist), and in 2010, at a height of 1 meter, a circumference of 11.58 meters. With these circumferential dimensions, the Linden tree is not only one of the most circumferential Linden trees in Germany but also in Europe.

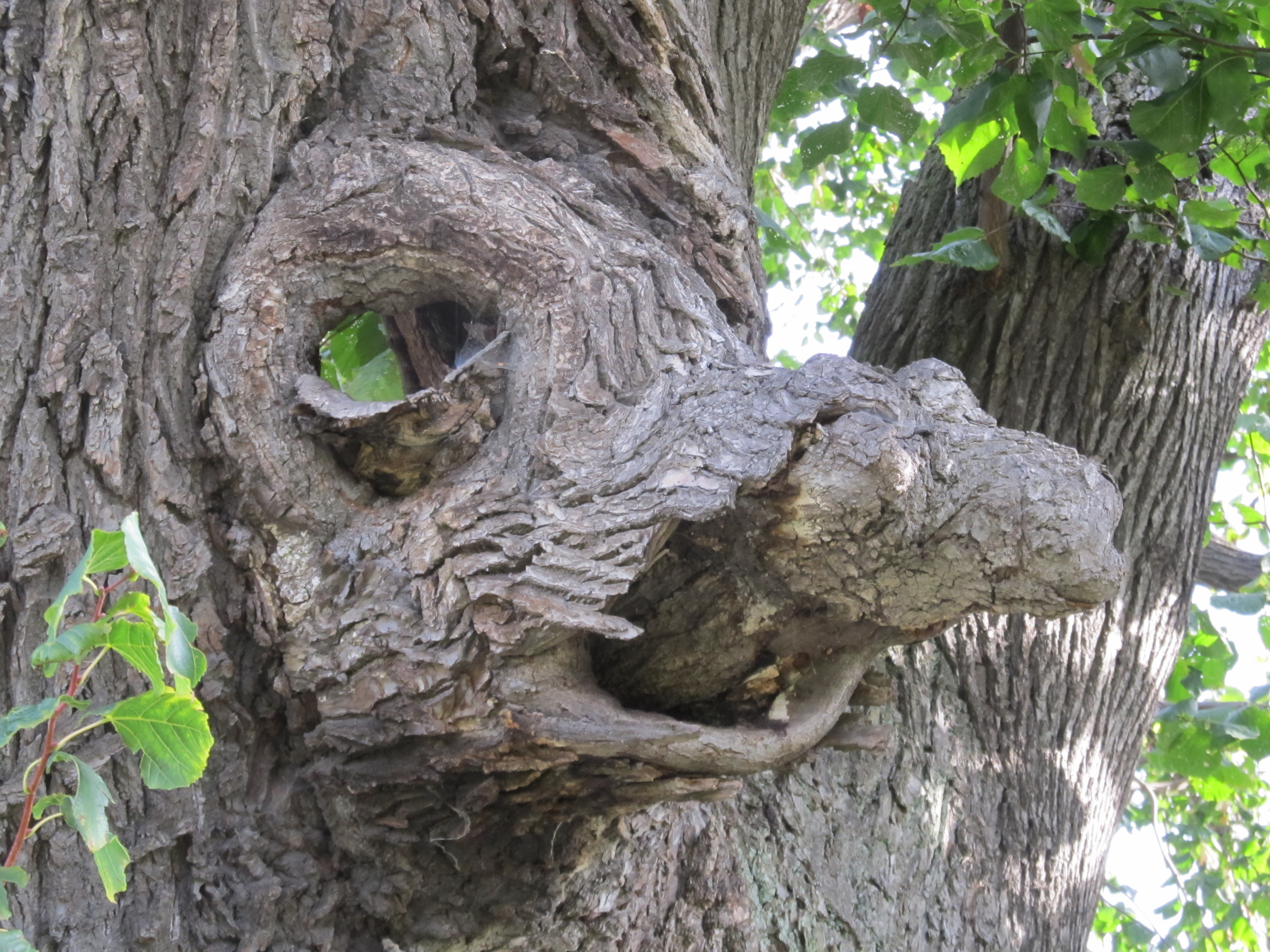
Tree face - detail on the trunk

Due to the absence of the oldest wood in the center of the log, conducting a tree ring count is challenging. Traditional methods such as drill core extraction or drilling resistance measurement using a resistograph cannot provide accurate results in this case. For the same reason, age determination using the radioactive carbon content (radiocarbon dating, also called 14C dating) is not feasible; samples taken are from much younger wood tissue. Consequently, the age of the tree can only be approximated. Various sources in the literature provide different estimates ranging from 400 to 800 years. According to the (Deutsche Baumarchiv) German Tree Archive, the age of the lime tree is estimated to be around 400 to 600 years in 2012. Hans Joachim Fröhlich assumed an age of about 800 years in 1994, while Michel Brunner estimated it at 700 years in 2007. Jeroen Pater's estimation in 2006 ranged from 500 to 600. The brochure Baum-Naturdenkmale in der Region Oberes Elbtal/Osterzgebirge (Tree Natural Monuments in the Upper Elbe Valley/Eastern Ore Mountains Region) indicates an age of 600 to 700 years.

== Lindenmuseum Clara Schumann ==
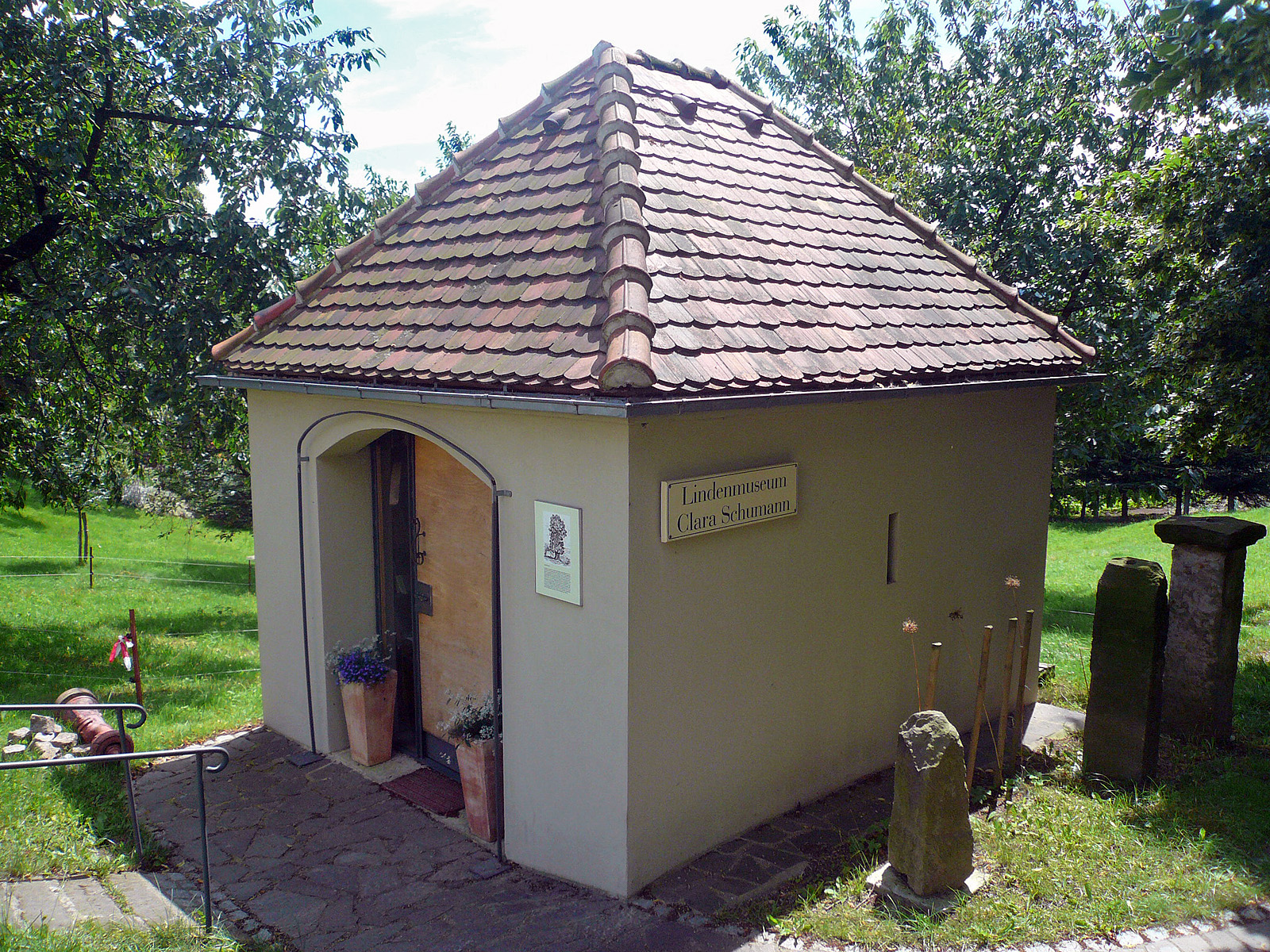
Lindenmuseum Clara Schumann

The Lindenmuseum Clara Schumann is adjacent to the Linden tree. The museum, named after the pianist Clara Schumann, who hiked to the Linden tree multiple times, is always open and free to the public. The earliest known documentation of the building dates back to 1888 when it was utilized as a fire station, as depicted in a drawing within the Bergblume (Mountain flowers). The roof truss of the building still retains the original suspension apparatus for fire hoses. From 1992 it served as a post office for Schmorsdorf. The barred window on the back side of the building still testifies to this. It was inaugurated on 27 May 2006, and has an exhibition area of 6.85 square meters, making it the smallest free-standing museum in Saxony, possibly even in Germany. In addition, it is the only museum dedicated to a Linden tree and to Clara Schumann in Germany. Citizens of the district built the museum with the support of local companies. The history of the lime tree and the village of Schmorsdorf is told on four large display boards. The display boards contain excerpts from the log book of the Schmorsdorf-Crotta village council, which records the most important events affecting the village from 1874 to 20 January 1954. Clara Schumann is also honored on display boards. Furthermore, as part of the museum's offerings, visitors can watch a film titled 700 Years of Maxen, created by Ernst Hirsch in 1955. This film is screened on a television set located in the attic of the museum building, providing a unique perspective on the local festival.

== Narratives ==
The lime tree in the center of the village has been an integral part of village life for centuries, surrounded by numerous stories, legends, and customs. It is believed that in the past, meetings of the municipal court were held under the lime tree, although there is no written evidence to confirm this. According to local folklore, the lime tree grants one wish per year to those who quietly sit beneath it. During weddings, the bridal couples line up with the wedding party and traditionally gather in front of the lime tree for a group photo. Additionally, it is a custom in the village for the deceased to be carried past the lime tree on their last journey, paying tribute to the enduring presence of the tree in the community.
