= Daniel Zhitomirsky =

Russian musicologist (1906–1992)

Daniel Vladimirovich Zhitomirsky (22 December 1906 – 27 June 1992) was a Russian musicologist and music critic who specialized in the music of German composer Robert Schumann and the aesthetics of German Romanticism. He also wrote extensively on Russian composers of the Soviet period, especially Dmitri Shostakovich.

== Life and career ==
Zhitomirsky studied music theory at Kharkiv Conservatory under S.S. Bogatiryov, then music history and theory with Ivanov–Boretsky and composition with Zhilyayev at the Moscow Conservatory, where he graduated in 1931. In the late 1920s and early 1930s, Zhitomirsky was a member of the Russian Association of Proletarian Musicians (RAPM) and served as a music critic for the journals Prolietarskiy muzikant (The Proletarian Musician) and Za proletarskuya muziku (For Proletarian Music). Throughout his career, he served a variety of newspapers and periodicals as a music critic.

Zhitomirsky began teaching music history and introductory classes in music analysis at the Moscow Conservatory in 1931 and in 1936 was made senior lecturer. Forced to leave his post in 1937, he was quickly reinstated. He was dismissed again in 1948, the year of the Zhdanov decree that affected composers Aram Khachaturian, Sergei Prokofiev and Dmitri Shostakovich, in a. The cause for his dismissal, a printed denunciation by the Union of Soviet Composers and an official censure was anti-Semitism, conducted under the bureaucratic veneer of a campaign against "cosmpolitalism." According to musicologists Judith Kuhn and Richard Taruskin, this campaign, which included the murder of virtually every Jewish cultural activist over a five–year period, became the first instance of anti-Semitism as "official government policy in the Soviet Union." Following this political fallout, Zhitomirsky taught as senior lecturer at the conservatory of Azerbaijan Conservatory in Baku from 1949 to 1953 and at the Gorky Conservatory from 1955 to 1970. In 1965, he was made a senior scientific officer at the Moscow Institute for the History of Art.

While Zhitomirsky focused primarily on Schumann's music, letters and written articles, he also studied Russian musical culture of the later 19th and early 20th centuries. He was the first Russian musicologist to assess the music of Alexander Scriabin in the context of the spiritual movements with which the composer was associated. He also wrote on Soviet composers of the 1920s, especially Shostakovich. He wrote his articles, reviews and reminiscences of Shostakovich in what Detlev Gojowy, in the New Grove, called "a nonconformist attitude." Zhitomirsky's presentation at the Leningrad conference of 1968, Gojowy adds, was similarly colored and shed new light on the history of Soviet music. However, toward the end of his life, he developed a conservative attitude on contemporary music, especially about avant–garde composers.

== Degrees and honors ==
Zhitomirsky received his Kandidat degree in 1942 with a dissertation on Pyotr Ilyich Tchaikovsky. He received his doctorate in 1942 with a dissertation on Robert Schumann. He was awarded the Robert Schumann Prize of the City of Zwickau in 1966.

== Shostakovich ==
In The Shostakovich Casebook, Irina Nikolskaya portrays Zhitomirsky as someone who "made" Shostakovich into an acceptable artist for the Soviet bureaucracy. At a June 1929 meeting of the RAPM, where members denounced Shostakovich's opera The Nose for "formalism" and "anti–Soviet escapism", Zhitomirsky reportedly pointed his fist at the composer and said, "If he does not accept the falsity of his path, then his work will inevitably find itself at a dead end." Later, however, Zhitomersky became a supporter of the composer and may have ghost written some of his official speeches and articles. Nikolskaya says Zhitomirsky eventually portrayed Shostakovich as an artist "living in internal exile, one who totally rejected the existing system and repudiated everything Soviet."

Zhitomirsky's positive review and subsequent defense of Shostakovich's Ninth Symphony, which would be singled out by the authorities for its "formalism" under the Zhdanov decree, might not have helped his personal position. He also defended the Third String Quartet, written at approximately the same period, when other Soviet critics remained silent. In a monograph on the composer, Zhitomirsky emphasized the quartet's "rich and multi-faceted content" and called it "an entire world of romantic feelings, where the beauty of bright, 'naive' daydreams exists side-by-side with austere patriotic passion, with grief and heroism."

Much later, while Zhitomirsky remained resolute against serial music in general, he defended Shostakovich's use of the 12-tone system in his late works. In the September 1976 issue of Sovietskaia muzyka (Soviet Music), he emphasized the "indissoluble connection between the tonal and atonal moments in Shostakovich's music" and the fact that the composer's atonal themes "create the optimal conditions for the expulsion of a tonal center.... The tonal beginning of them, as is correct, does not vanish, although frequently it is as if already hanging by a thread." Zhitomirsky claimed that Shostakovich used 12-tone themes for expressive effect and were thus an extension of a type of "melodic intensity" which had existed since the 19th century.

== Bibliography ==
- Fanning, David, "Shostakovich, Dmitry (Dmitriyevich)." In The New Grove Dictionary of Music and Musicians, Second Edition (London: Macmillan, 2001), 29 vols., ed. Sadie, Stanley. ISBN 1-56159-239-0.
- Fanning, David, "Placing Shostakovich and the Eighth Quartet." In Shostakovich: String Quartet No. 8 (Landmarks in Music Since 1950) (Ashgate Publishing Limited, 2004). ISBN 0-754-60699-6.
- Fay, Laurel E., Shostakovich: A Life (Oxford and New York: Oxford University Press, 2000). ISBN 0-19-513438-9.
- Gojowy, Detlef, "Zhitomirsky, Daniil Vladimorovich." In The New Grove Dictionary of Music and Musicians, Second Edition (London: Macmillan, 2001), 29 vols., ed. Sadie, Stanley. ISBN 1-56159-239-0.
- Keldesh, Yury, "Zhitomirsky, Daniil Vladimorovich." In The New Grove Dictionary of Music and Musicians, First Edition (London: Macmillan, 1980), 20 vols., ed. Sadie, Stanley. ISBN 0-333-23111-2.
- Kuhn, Judith, Shostakovich in Dialogue: Form, Imagery and Ideas in Quartets 1–7 (Ashgate Publishing, 2010). ISBN 0-754-66406-6.
- MacDonald, Ian, The New Shostakovich (Boston: Northeastern University Press, 1990). ISBN 1-55553-089-3.
- Maes, Francis, tr. Arnold J. Pomerans and Erica Pomerans, A History of Russian Music: From Kamarinskaya to Babi Yar (Berkeley, Los Angeles and London: University of California Press, 2002). ISBN 0-520-21815-9.
- Nikolskaya, Irina, "Shostakovich Remembered: Interviews with His Soviet Colleagues." In The Shostakovich Casebook (Indiana University Press, 2004), ed. Brown, Malcolm Hamrick. ISBN 0-253-34364-X.
- Schmelz, Peter J., "Shostakovich's 'Twelve-Tone' Compositions and the Politics and Practice of Soviet Serialism." In Shostakovich and His World (Princeton, NJ: Princeton University Press, 2004), ed. Fay, Laurel E. ISBN 0-691-12069-2.
- Taruskin, Richard, "Shostakovich and Us." Retrieved 29 Mar 2012.
