= Ernst Burger (musicologist) =

German pianist

Ernst Burger (born 26 March 1937) is a German pianist and musicologist.

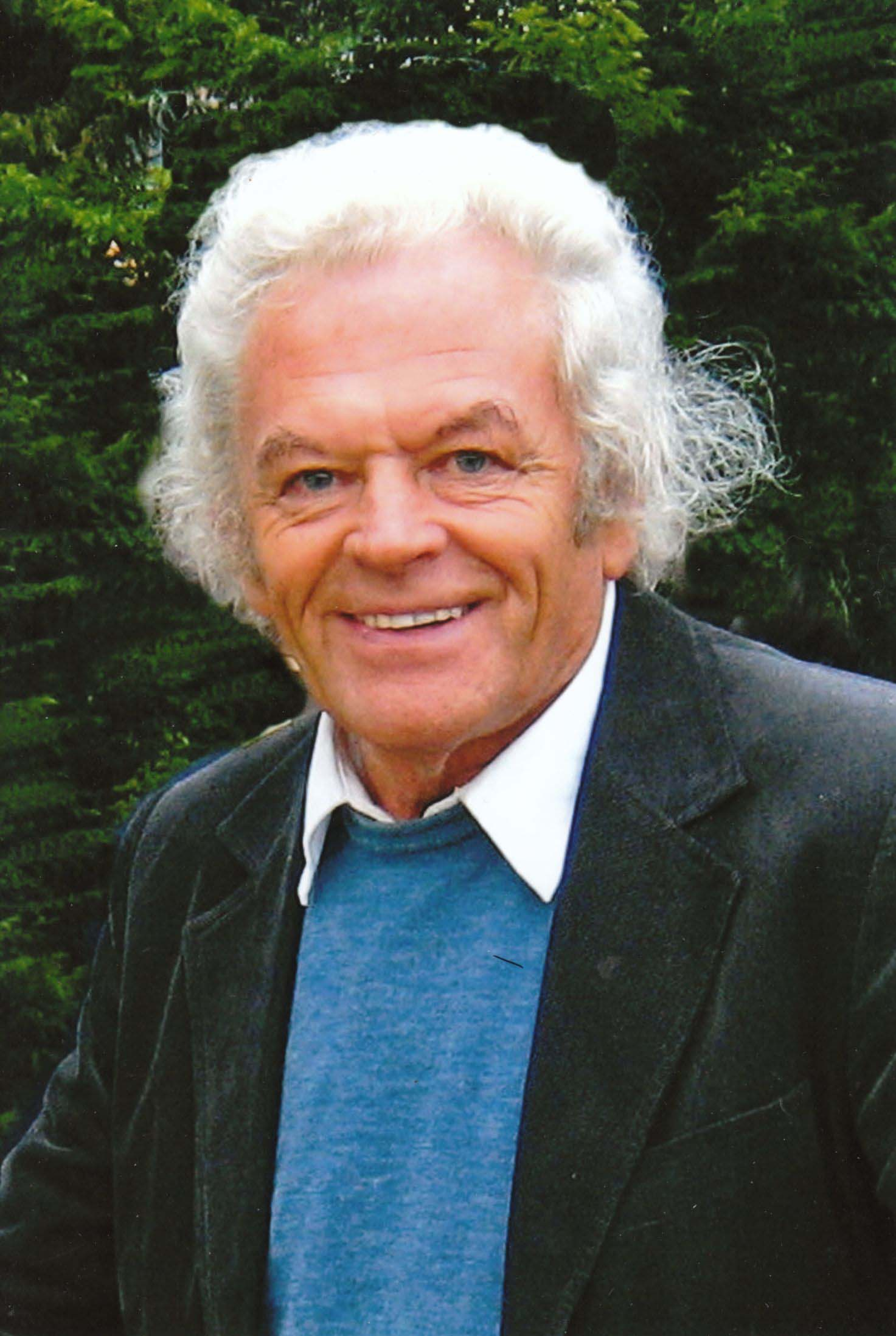
Ernst Burger

== Life and career ==
Burger was born in Munich. After attending the humanistic grammar school in Burghausen he studied at the University of Music and Performing Arts Munich, where he graduated as a concert pianist. He then began to give concerts, devoting himself mainly to the piano works of Frédéric Chopin.

After a serious hand injury, writing about music is the focus of his activities. His books soon found worldwide recognition and were awarded prizes.

Burger has been married to Dorothea Maillinger since 1972.

== Works ==
- Franz Liszt. Eine Lebenschronik in Bildern und Dokumenten List Verlag, Munich 1986 ISBN 3-471-77160-3
  - French edition: Franz Liszt. Chronique biographique en images et en documents. Fayard, Paris 1988
  - English edition: Franz Liszt. A Chronicle of his life in pictures and documents. Princeton University Press, New York 1989 ISBN 0-691-09133-1
- Frédéric Chopin. Eine Lebenschronik in Bildern und Dokumenten. Hirmer, München 1990 ISBN 3-7774-5370-6
- Robert Schumann. Eine Lebenschronik in Bildern und Dokumenten Schott, Mainz 1999 ISBN 0-691-09133-1
- Franz Liszt in der Photographie seiner Zeit. Hirmer, Munich 2003 ISBN 3-7774-9790-8
  - Franz Liszt nelle fotografie d’epoca. Collezione Ernst Burger [bilingual: Italian and English]. Rome, De Luca Editori d’Arte 2011
- Erroll Garner. Leben und Kunst eines genialen Pianisten. ConBrio, Regensburg 2006 ISBN 978-3-932581-81-6
- Franz Liszt. Die Jahre in Rom und Tivoli. Schott, Mainz 2010, 2nd edition 2011 ISBN 978-3-7957-0715-6
- Franz Liszt. Leben und Sterben in Bayreuth. ConBrio, Regensburg 2011 ISBN 978-3-940768-26-1

== Awards ==
- Ordre pour le mérite culturel (Warsaw 1991)
- Deutscher Musikeditionspreis (Bonn 1999)
- Robert Schumann Prize of the City of Zwickau 1999
