= Joachim Draheim =

German musicologist, music teacher and pianist

Joachim Draheim (born in 1950) is a German musicologist, music teacher and classical pianist.

== Life and career ==
Born in Berlin, Draheim studied classical philology, history and musicology in Heidelberg. He received his doctorate with the thesis "Setting to music ancient texts from the Baroque to the present" (Amsterdam 1981). Since 1973 Draheim has worked as a freelancer for Südwestrundfunk and since 1974 for several German and international music publishers (including Breitkopf & Härtel, Schott, Ricordi, Friedrich Hofmeister den Wiener Urtext Edit) and record companies. Draheim published numerous editions of works by Haydn, Mozart, Beethoven, Schubert, Fanny Hensel, Mendelssohn, Chopin, Robert and Clara Schumann, Brahms and Busoni. These included several first editions: among others, Mendelssohn's Albumblatt in A major, the Sonata in D major and the Sonata movement in G minor for two pianos; of Brahms, "Die Müllerin"; of Schumann "Der Korsar", an arrangement of the cello Concerto in A minor op. cit. 129 for violin, the piano accompaniment to Bach's Suite in C major for solo cello and Variations on a Nocturne for piano by Chopin.

Draheim also appeared as a pianist in concerts, on radio (SDR, SWF, SR, SWR) and in record and CD productions. Draheim has been teaching Latin and music at the Lessing-Gymnasium Karlsruhe since 1978. He is a member of the New Schumann Complete Edition, the Fryderyk Chopin Institute in Warsaw and the new Die Musik in Geschichte und Gegenwart. In the year 2003 Draheim received the Robert Schumann Prize of the City of Zwickau. In 2004 Draheim's Karlsruher Musikgeschichte was published by Info Verlag in Karlsruhe.

== Publications ==
- Vertonungen antiker Texte vom Barock bis zur Gegenwart. (1978)
- Johannes Brahms in Baden-Baden und Karlsruhe : eine Ausstellung der Badischen Landesbibliothek Karlsruhe und der Brahmsgesellschaft Baden-Baden. (1983)
- Horaz-Vertonungen vom Mittelalter bis zur Gegenwart : eine Anthologie. (1985)
- Karlsruher Musikgeschichte. (2004)
- Robert und Clara Schumann an Oberrhein und Neckar . (2010)
