= Herbert Schulze (musicologist) =

German musicologist

Herbert Schulze (4 September 1923 – 6 June 1975 in Leipzig) was a German musicologist. Schulze was a proven Schumann expert and for many years chief editor of the Deutscher Verlag der Wissenschaften in Leipzig. In 1969, Schulze was awarded the Robert Schumann Prize of the City of Zwickau.
