= Georg Eismann =

20th-century German musicologist

Georg Eismann (1899–1968) was a German musicologist. He worked as a teacher at the Gymnasium Dresden-Plauen, subsequently taking over as the second director of the Robert Schumann House in Zwickau in 1945. He was also director of the Schumann Museum in Zwickau.

In 1964, he was awarded the Robert-Schumann-Prize of the City of Zwickau.

== Selected works ==
- Erinnerungen an Felix Mendelssohn Bartholdy. Nachgelassene Aufzeichnungen von Robert Schumann. Predella, Zwickau 1947, Literature by and about Georg Eismann in the German National Library catalogue.
- Das Robert-Schumann-Haus in Zwickau. Nationale Forschungs- und Gedenkstätten der klassischen Deutschen Literatur, Weimar 1958, Literature by and about Georg Eismann in the German National Library catalogue.
- Robert Schumann. Tagebücher. Volume 1: 1827–1838. Deutscher Verlag für Musik, Leipzig 1971. 2nd edition 1987, ISBN 978-3-370-00039-9.
