= Walter Wiora =

German musicologist and music historian

Walter Wiora (30 December 1906 – 8 February 1997) was a German musicologist and music historian.

== Life and career ==
Born in Kattowitz, Wiora received his doctorate in Freiburg with Wilibald Gurlitt and then worked as an assistant at the Deutsches Volksliedarchiv in Freiburg. He became on request of 19 May 1937 member of the Nazi Party number 4.715.785. In 1940 he wrote a contribution to folk song research in Alfred Rosenberg's magazine "Die Musik" under the title: "Die Molltonart im Volkslied der Deutschen in Polen und im polnischen Volkslied" (The minor key in the German folk song in Poland and in the Polish folk song). Wiora was habilitated in 1941 and in 1942 lecturer at the "Reichsuniversität Posen". At the same time he was a music critic for the newspaper Das Reich.

After the Second World War, he returned to the German Folk Song Archive in 1946, where he worked as an archivist and head of the music department until 1958. In 1957 he founded the Herder Research Centre for Music History, which he headed until 1962. From October 1958 he was Professor of Musicology at the Christian-Albrechts-Universität Kiel. 1962/63 he was Visiting Professor at the Columbia University. From 1964 to 1972 he worked at the University of Saarland as a musicology professor. His successor in Saarbrücken was Werner Braun.

Wiora initially dealt with the German Lied. In his opinion, the folk song was extinct in its first existence, the rural authentic, and was replaced by its second existence as a bourgeois representative song.

=== The Four Ages of Music ===
In his main work Die vier Weltalter der Musik Wiora gives an overall draft of music history. The first chapter, prehistoric and early times, deals with the hunter culture of the Stone Age, it deals with religious rituals (shamanism), sedentariness and burials and examines the characteristics of "primeval" music in the survival of indigenous peoples. According to Wiora, large instruments such as giant drums or alphorns are a characteristic of such cultures. He tries analytically to distinguish between really primitive music and reprimanded music. This age is more productive than one might expect at first glance.

In the second chapter he examines music and musical life in the advanced civilizations of antiquity. Through the old Jewish texts and Synagogal Singing he draws conclusions about the even older musical cultures of the Sumerians, Babylonians and Mesopotamians. He examines the train towards the desensualization and internalization of musical life in Jewish and Christian antiquity. According to Wiora this is the reason why orthodox Christian churches do not use organs.

In the third age he explores Eastern and Western and grants Western music a special position, similar to that of the ancient Greeks in philosophy and mathematics. He illuminates the unique theoretical penetration of the object in the disclosure of the laws of music, without displacing the natural through coercive orders.

In the fourth chapter on the world age of technology and global industrial culture he describes the conquest of "new territory" and the narrowing to the limits of music since the 19th century, for example in Max Reger and Claude Debussy. He partly discovers a reversal of the laws of the first age, partly an ideologization, dehumanization and the confrontation with it. The focus here is on the intentions of Neue Musik, but includes "revolutionary" rock. Wiora approves of jazz more than a mixture of European harmonies and African rhythms and performance.

Wiora also recorded a multi-part radio broadcast on this topic, which was broadcast by Bayerischer Rundfunk.

Wiora died in Tutzing at age 90.

== Publications ==
- Die Molltonart im Volkslied der Deutschen in Polen und im polnischen Volkslied. In: Die Musik XXXII/1940, p. 158–162
- Die deutsche Volksliedweise und der Osten = Schriften zur musikalischen Volks- und Rassenkunde volume 4. Kallmeyer, Wolfenbüttel 1940
- Die Variantenbildung im Volkslied: Ein Beitrag zur systematischen Musikwissenschaft, Walter de Gruyter, Berlin, 1941
- Das echte Volkslied Müller-Thiergarten-Verlag, Heidelberg 1950
- Die rheinisch-bergischen Melodien bei Zuccalmaglio und Brahms, Alte Liedweisen in romantischer Färbung, Bad Godesberg 1953
- Die geschichtliche Sonderstellung der abendländischen Musik, Schott's Söhne, Mainz, 1959
- Historische und systematische Musikwissenschaft. – Schneider, Tutzing 1972
- Die vier Weltalter der Musik, ein universalhistorischer Entwurf, dtv 1988, ISBN 342304473X (erweiterte Neuauflage)
- Saarbrücker Studien zur Musikwissenschaft, Bärenreiter-Verl., Kassel
