= Reinhard Kapp =

German musicologist (born 1947)

- Born: May 13, 1947 (age 78); Hof, Bavaria, Germany
- Citizenship: German
- Occupation: Musicologist
- Known for: Studies on Robert Schumann

Reinhard Kapp (born 13 May 1947 in Hof, Bavaria) is a German musicologist whose work focuses on Robert Schumann.

== Publications ==
- Reinhard Kapp (editor): Notizbuch 5/6. Musik, Berlin, Vienna 1982, S. 253ff.
- Schumann in his time and since. In Beate Perrey (editor): The Cambridge Companion to Schumann. 2007, p. 223–251. Publication of the German original with the permission of Cambridge University Press.
- Reinhard Kapp: Chronologisches Verzeichnis (in progress) der auf Orpheus (und/oder Eurydike) bezogenen oder zu beziehenden Opern, Kantaten, Instrumentalmusiken, literarischen Texte, Theaterstücke, Filme und historiographischen Arbeiten.
- Reinhard Kapp: Von der Sprache der Seele. In line (PDF file without bibliogr. edition; 4,2–MB
