= Werner Braun (musicologist) =

German musicologist (1926–2012)

Werner Hermann Georg Braun (19 May 1926 – 24 August 2012) was a German musicologist.

== Life ==
Born in Sangerhausen, Braun studied musicology at the Martin Luther University of Halle-Wittenberg from 1946 to 1950 with Max Schneider and school music with main instrument piano and Germanistics. In 1950 he passed the Staatsexamen for the teaching profession in the subjects music and German. From 1951 on he worked as Hochschulassistent and later as senior assistant at the musicological institute of the Martin-Luther-University in Halle. In 1952 he received his doctorate with a dissertation on Johann Mattheson. In 1958, the University of Halle-Wittenberg accepted his habilitation on the Central German Choral Passion in the 18th century. At the end of 1961, Braun left the German Democratic Republic with his wife and children and became a Privatdozent at the Christian-Albrechts-Universität zu Kiel, combined with a research position. There he was appointed extraordinary professor in 1967. In 1968 he moved to Saarbrücken as a scientific councilor with a professorial title at the Saarland University. There he became Ordinarius for Musicology in July 1972 as successor to Walter Wiora. After the formal abolition of the chairs by the Saarland University Act in the later 1970s, Braun was given the title of "Professor for life" (salary scale C). He held this office until his emeritus appointment in autumn 1994.

== Academic activity ==
Braun's main areas of research were German and British music history of the 17th and 18th centuries, especially North and Central German church music, opera and Singspiel, art song and music theory of this period. His important research work includes Britannia abundans (1977), a fundamental study of Anglo-German musical relations at the time of William Shakespeare, The change of style of music around 1600 (1982), an analysis of the transition from Renaissance music to Baroque music, and Thöne und Melodeyen, Arien und Canzonetten (2004), a comprehensive treatise on the German art song in the Baroque era. Within the Neue Handbuch der Musikwissenschaft edited by Carl Dahlhaus and Hermann Danuser, Braun wrote the volume on 17th century music (1981), and in the edited collection Geschichte der Musiktheorie he is author of the volume on the historical development of German music theory from Sethus Calvisius to Johann Mattheson.

Braun wrote (until 2007) 15 monographs, about 140 scientific essays and 38 articles for the new edition of the encyclopedia Die Musik in Geschichte und Gegenwart (1994-2007). In addition, he published eight editions of sheet music by German composers of the 17th and 18th centuries. From 1987 to 1993 he was founder and director of the publication series Saarbrücker Studien zur Musikwissenschaft, Neue Folge. On his 65th and 75th birthday, one commemorative publication each was dedicated to him.

Braun was a member of the Scientific Advisory Board of the Critical Complete Edition of all works of Johann Rosenmüller.

Braun died in Saarbrücken at the age of 86.

== Work ==
- Die mitteldeutsche Choralpassion im 18. Jahrhundert. Evangelische Verlags-Anstalt, Berlin 1960 (at the same time: habilitation thesis Universität Halle-Wittenberg 1958)
- Das Problem der Epochengliederung in der Musik. Darmstadt 1977, ISBN 3-534-07157-3
- Britannia abundans. Deutsch-englische Musikbeziehungen zur Shakespearezeit. Schneider, Tutzing 1977, ISBN 3-7952-0198-5
- Die Musik des 17. Jahrhunderts. Laaber-Verlag, Laaber 1981, ISBN 3-7952-0198-5 (Neues Handbuch der Musikwissenschaft, volume 4)
- Der Stilwandel in der Musik um 1600. Wissenschaftliche Buchgesellschaft, Darmstadt 1981, ISBN 3-534-08448-9
- Samuel Michael und die Instrumentalmusik um 1630. Wissenschaftliche Buchgesellschaft, Darmstadt 1990, ISBN 3-925036-50-4
- Die Musiktheorie des 16. und 17. Jahrhunderts in Deutschland, volume 2: Deutsche Musiktheorie von Calvisius bis Mattheson. Wissenschaftliche Buchgesellschaft, Darmstadt 1994, ISBN 3-534-11997-5 (Geschichte der Musiktheorie, volume 8, part 2)
- Thöne und Melodeyen, Arien und Canzonetten. Zur Musik des deutschen Barockliedes. Niemeyer, Tübingen 2004, ISBN 3-484-36600-1

== Editions ==
- Heinrich Schütz: Unser Herr Jesus Christus in der Nacht, da er verraten ward (SW 495). Bärenreiter, Kassel 1961
- Johann Walter: Sämtliche Werke, volume 4. Bärenreiter, Kassel 1973
- Johann Gottfried Müthel: Klavierkonzerte. Katzbichler, Munich 1979 (Denkmäler norddeutscher Musik, volumes 3/4)
