= Gerd Nauhaus =

German musicologist (1942–2026)

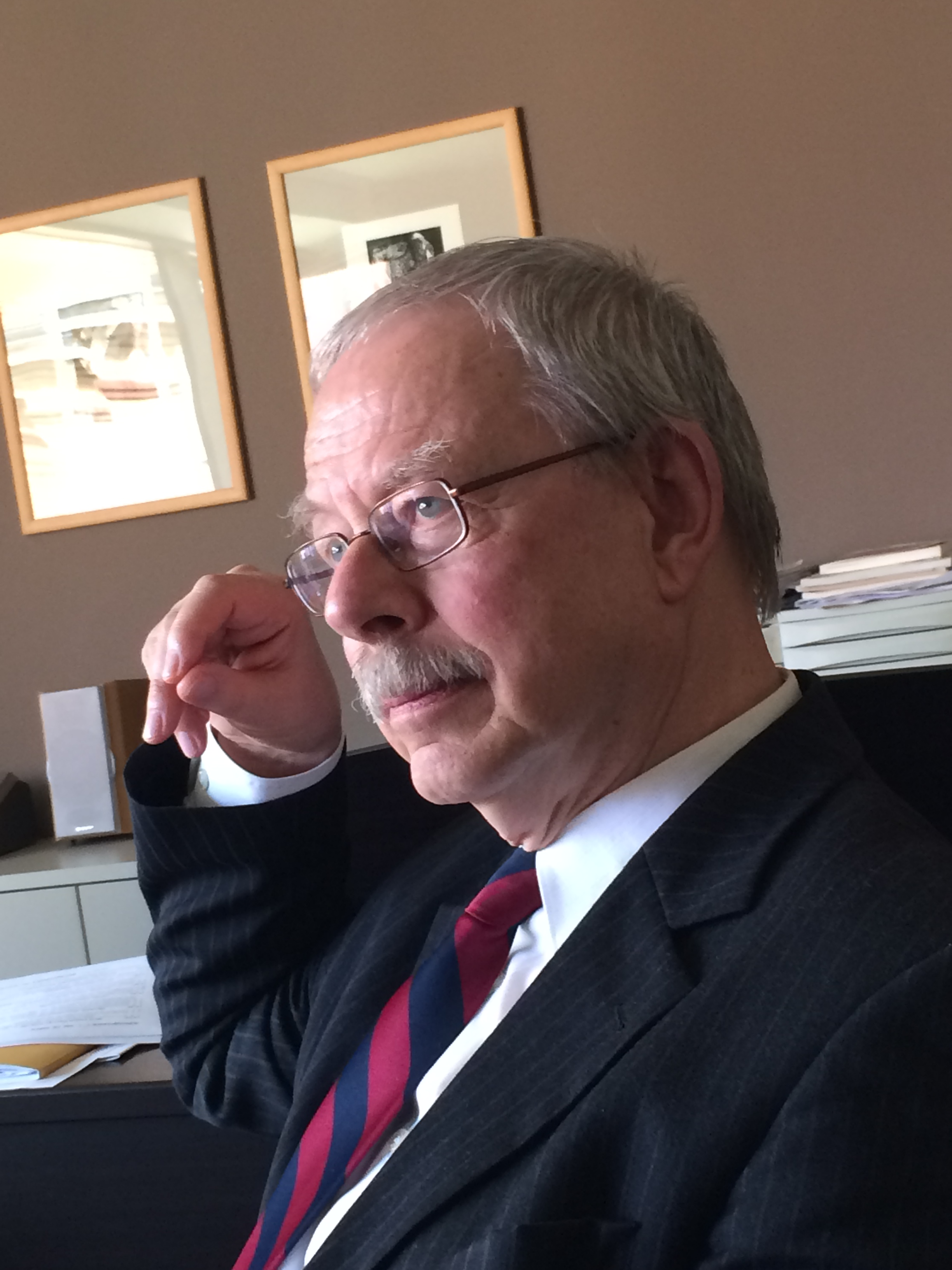
- Gerd Nauhaus in 2016
- Born: July 28, 1942; Erfurt
- Died: September 25, 2026 (aged 84); Zwickau
- Resting place: Erfurt
- Occupation: Musicologist

Gerd Nauhaus (born 28 July 1942 in Erfurt, died 25 September 2026 in Zwickau) was a German musicologist and the long-time driector of the Robert Schumann House in Zwickau.

He studied music education, German philology, and musicology at Martin Luther University Halle-Wittenberg, where he earned his doctorate in 1980. From 1967 to 1970, he served as music dramaturg at the Zwickau Theater. He then worked as a research assistant, head of the archives (beginning in 1985), and deputy director at the Robert Schumann House in Zwickau, where he served as director from 1993 to 2005.

In 1986, Gerd Nauhaus received the Robert Schumann Prize from the City of Zwickau. He served on the Saxon Cultural Senate from 1993 to 2002 and had been a board member of the Robert Schumann Society of Zwickau, e. V., since 1989; he served as its chairman from 2006 to 2012; after which he was elected honorary chairman for life. He served as artistic director of the International Robert Schumann Competitions for Piano and Voice in Zwickau in 2000, 2004, and 2008. Gerd Nauhaus was the editor of Robert Schumann’s diaries and of the Schumann Studies series. Together with Ingrid Bodsch, he published a new edition of Robert and Clara Schumann’s marriage diaries in 2007. He also edited publications about and compositions by Clara Schumann and authored numerous articles and essays. He participated in symposia and conferences both in Germany and abroad. Lecture tours took him to Belgium, Austria, Switzerland, the United States, and Cyprus, among other places. Beginning in 2011, he collaborated with Nancy B. Reich (New York) on the edition of Clara Schumann’s youth diaries, which was published in 2019 by Georg Olms Verlag.

== Publications (Selected Works) ==
- Robert Schumann, Tagebücher, 2 volumes, published by Gerd Nauhaus, Leipzig: Deutscher Verlag für Musik 1971–1987.
- Clara Schumann, Blumenbuch für Robert. 1854–1856, Faksimile-Wiedergabe, published by Gerd Nauhaus and Ingrid Bodsch in collaboration with Susanna Kosmale and Ute Scholz, Bonn: Verlag Stadtmuseum Bonn 2006 (2nd edition 2016).
- Robert Schumann, Dichtergarten für Musik. Eine Anthologie für Freunde der Literatur und Musik, published by Gerd Nauhaus and Ingrid Bodsch, Frankfurt am Main: Stroemfeld 2007.
- Robert und Clara Schumann, Ehetagebücher, published by Gerd Nauhaus and Ingrid Bodsch, Bonn/Frankfurt am Main: Stroemfeld 2007.
- "Wir waren sieben" – die Kinder Robert und Clara Schumanns (= Correspondenz Sonderheft II, published by Irmgard Knechtges-Obrecht), Aachen: Shaker Verlag 2013.
- Clara Schumann, Jugendtagebücher 1827–1840, published by Gerd Nauhaus and Nancy B. Reich, Hildesheim/Zürich/New York: Olms 2019.

== Essays (Selected Works) ==
- Dokumente zur Vorgeschichte der "Gesammelten Schriften über Musik und Musiker" von Robert Schumann, in Gutenberg-Jahrbuch, vol. 64 (1989), pp. 180–201.
- Clara Schumann und die Musikerfamilie Kufferath, in Revue belge de musicologie, vol. 51 (1997), pp. 171–186.
- Clara Schumann und die Musikerfamilie Kufferath, in Peter Ackermann, Herbert Schneider (Eds.): Clara Schumann – Komponistin, Interpretin, Unternehmerin, Ikone, Hildesheim/Zürich/New York: Olms 1999, pp. 165–193.
- Zwischen Poesie und Musik – Schumann 2006, in Österreichische Musikzeitschrift, vol. 61 (2006), No. 10, pp 4–13.
- Die Schumanns auf dem Lande. Begegnungen und Kompositionen in Maxen und Kreischa, in Hans-Peter Lühr (Ed.): Robert Schumann in Dresden, Dresden: Dresdner Geschichtsverein 2010, pp. 28–35.
- Robert und Clara Schumann im Dresdner Musikleben 1844 bis 1850, in Thomas Synofzik, Hans-Günter Ottenberg (Eds.): Schumann und Dresden. Bericht über das Symposion "Robert und Clara Schumann in Dresden - biographische, kompositionsgeschichtliche und soziokulturelle Aspekte" in Dresden vom 15. bis 18. Mai 2008, Köln: Dohr 2010, pp. 271–286.
- Die Korrespondenz Schumanns mit den Verwandten in Tver', in Schumann-Studien, vol. 10 (2012), pp. 269–278.
- Robert Schumanns Mutter – eine Zeitzerin? Langwierige Spurensuche und endliche Aufklärung, in Zeitz und seine Umgebung. Vergangenheit, Gegenwart, Zukunft, No. 9 (2012), pp. 3–5.
- Tagebücher und mehr. Erfahrungen bei der Herausgabe von Schumann-Dokumenten, in Jean-Jacques Dünki, Anette Müller, Thomas Gartmann (Eds.): Schumann interpretieren, Sinzig: Studio Verlag 2014, pp. 61–70.
- Der unromantische Romantiker: ein vergessener Dichter der Schumannzeit, in Schumann-Studien, vol. 11 (2015), pp. 349–364.
- Clara Schumann in Kopenhagen, in Ingrid Bodsch (Ed.): On tour: Clara Schumann als Konzertvirtuosin auf Europas Bühnen, Bonn: Verlag Stadtmuseum Bonn 2019, pp. 217–227.
- Begegnung in Wien – Clara Wieck und "Fürst S.[chönburg]", in Ingrid Bodsch (Ed.): On tour: Clara Schumann als Konzertvirtuosin auf Europas Bühnen, Bonn: Verlag Stadtmuseum Bonn 2019, pp. 145–156.
- "Doppeltes Echo" – der Briefwechsel Robert und Clara Schumanns im Spiegel von Claras Jugendtagebüchern, in Schumann-Studien, vol. 13 (2021), pp. 149–161.
