= Robert Schumann House =

Birthplace of Robert Schumann

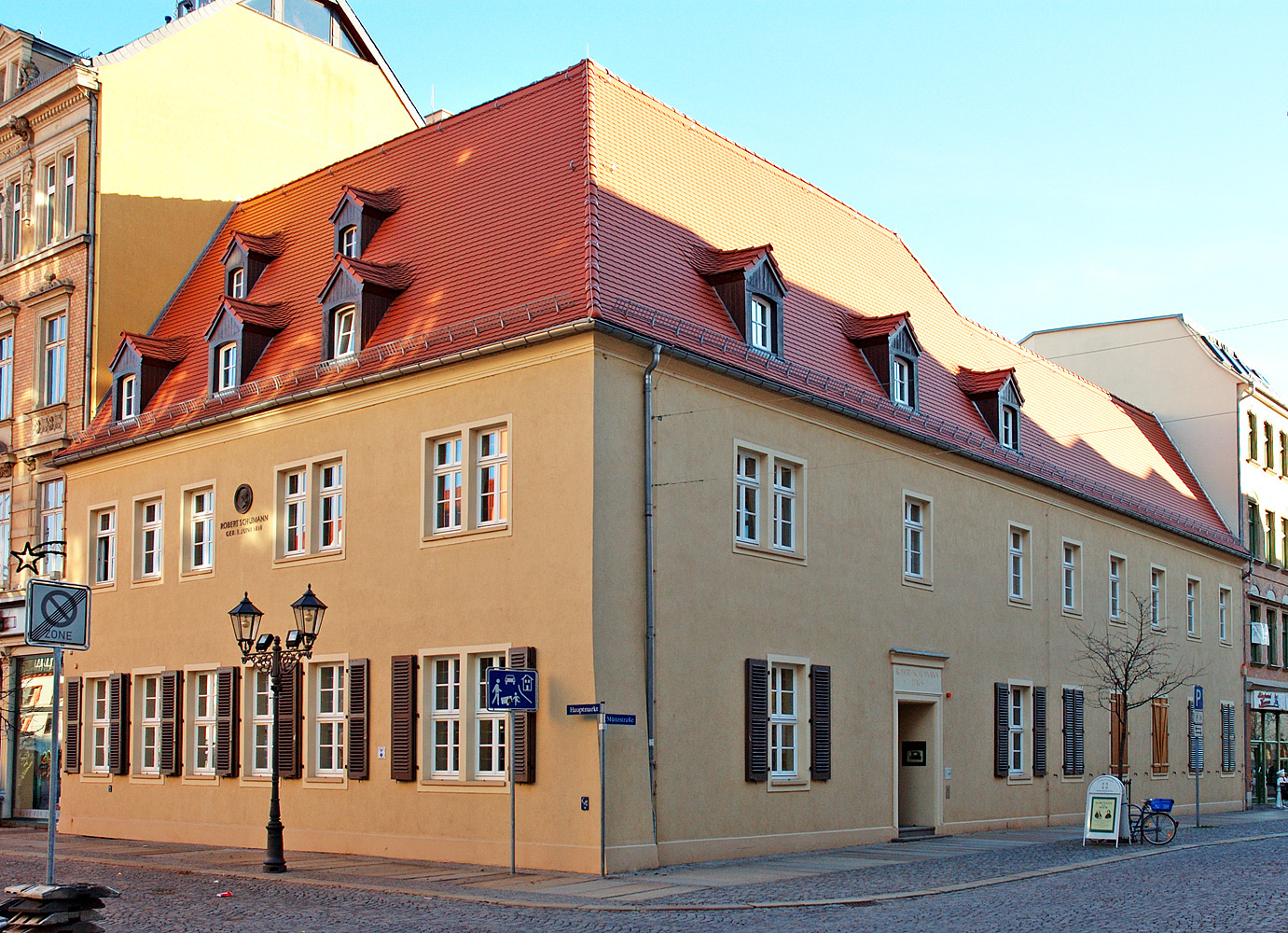

General information
- Address: Hauptmarkt 5; 08056 Zwickau
- Country: Germany
- Coordinates: 50°43′3″N 12°29′47″E

Website
- http://www.schumannzwickau.de/en/

Robert Schumann House is a museum in Zwickau in Germany. The composer Robert Schumann was born here in 1810; it now houses a large collection relating to the composer.

== Background ==
Three years before the composer was born, Schumann's family moved to Zwickau, from Ronneburg, Thuringia, where his siblings had been born. In Zwickau August Schumann, the composer's father, founded a bookstore with his brother, who was already living there. There was a school with a good reputation in the town (later named the Lyzeum) for the Schumann sons. Robert Schumann attended this school from 1820 until 1828; in that year he moved to Leipzig to study law.

== Details ==
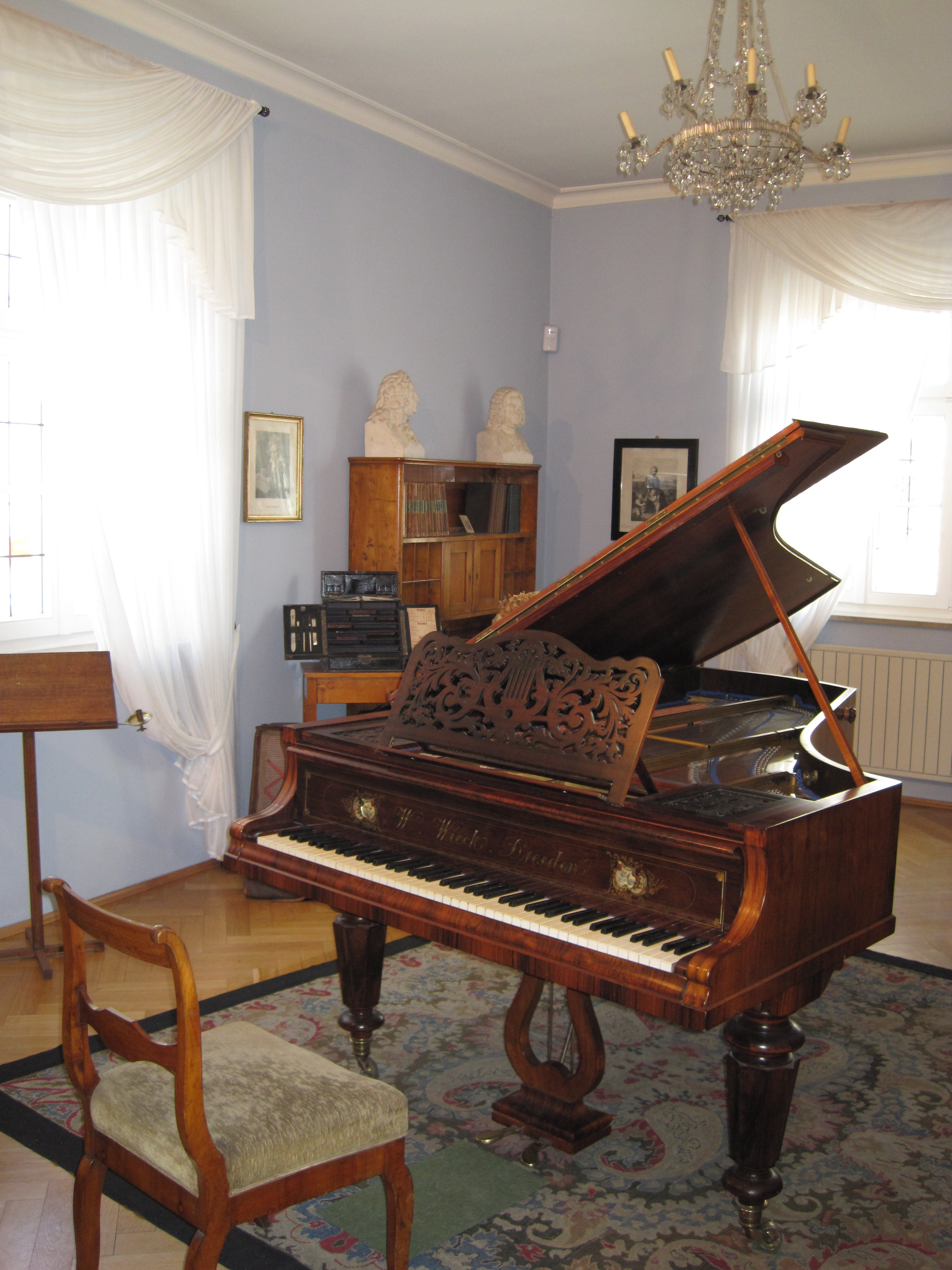
Interior of the museum

The Robert Schumann House, consisting of a museum, concert hall and research centre, was opened in 1956. There is a large collection relating to Robert Schumann.

The concert hall seats 140; sometimes the historic pianos from the museum are used here. The collection of pianos, all manufactured in the 19th century, includes a grand piano commissioned by Friedrich Wieck for his daughter Clara (later the composer's wife), on which she gave her concert debut, aged nine, at the Leipzig Gewandhaus.

The permanent exhibition is in eight rooms, each room dealing with a particular period in Schumann's life. The exhibition displays a selection of the archives, which include handwritten scores, first editions and a collection of paintings and early photographs. The archives also contain about 300 letters by Robert Schumann and more than 2,000 letters by Clara Schumann; also Robert Schumann's letter indexes, in which he recorded letters he wrote and received.

== See also ==
- Schumann House, Leipzig
- Lindenmuseum Clara Schumann
- List of music museums
