= Wolf-Dieter Hauschild =

German conductor (1937–2023)

Wolf-Dieter Hauschild (6 September 1937 – 18 May 2023) was a German conductor, choirmaster, artistic director, composer, harpsichordist and university lecturer.

After working for the East German Berliner Rundfunk from 1971, he was principal conductor of the MDR Leipzig Radio Symphony Orchestra and the Rundfunkchor Leipzig from 1978 to 1985. In 1984 he was awarded the National Prize of the German Democratic Republic, but in 1985 he fell out with the GDR authorities and moved to the FRG.

In Stuttgart, he was appointed general music director and helped the Stuttgart Philharmonic Orchestra there to national recognition. In 1991 he went to Essen, where he was also opera director of the Aalto Theater from 1992 to 1997. In the 2000s he returned to the new states of Germany and conducted the Philharmonisches Staatsorchester Halle and the Norddeutsche Philharmonie Rostock. The latter appointed him its honorary conductor in 2004.

Especially with the Berlin and Leipzig radio sound institutions, he brought numerous contemporary works to the world premieres. He also recorded the complete choral works of Johannes Brahms. In Essen he could realize the complete Ring by Wagner.

== Life ==
=== Greiz origin ===
Hauschild was born in 1937 as son of the journalist and dramaturge Franz Hauschild (1907–1996) in Greiz. His father was co-founder of the "Greizer Musikwochen" and the "Stavenhagen-Wettbewerb". At the age of five, Hauschild received his first piano lessons, later he took up theatre. Looking back he remembered Käthe Reichel, Reimar Johannes Baur and Dieter Franke with whom he had played in Greiz. He began composing at an early age, among others he wrote a Children opera. From the age of fifteen he composed incidental music for the theatre of his home town. As a high school student he also received musical composition lessons from Ottmar Gerster in Leipzig.

=== Studies and professional beginnings in Weimar ===
At the age of seventeen he began studying music at the Hochschule für Musik Franz Liszt, Weimar, which he completed in 1959 with three Staatsexamen: Musical composition (Ottmar Gerster), conducting (first with Hermann Abendroth, then Gerhard Pflüger) and piano. For his final thesis he designed a stage version of Mozart's Singspiel Bastien und Bastienne, which was performed at the Staatsoper Unter den Linden. He completed his training in master classes with Hermann Scherchen and Sergiu Celibidache. Until 1956 he was influenced above all by his teacher Hermann Abendroth, whose "overall personality and authority" he greatly appreciated. The latter let him work independently in Weimar with the Hochschulorchester and lay choir. Furthermore, for Hauschild the conductor and cultural politician Helmut Koch was "an artistic and human father figure.

After his studies Hauschild began his artistic career as répétiteur at the Deutsches Nationaltheater and Staatskapelle Weimar. Also here he composed incidental music for plays. Soon he was allowed to conduct and rehearse contemporary works. After two years he was Kapellmeister. In 1963 in Weimar he brought Chodscha Nasreddin's opera Der fröhliche Sünder of his teacher, Ottmar Gerster, for the world premiere.

=== Station in Frankfurt (Oder) ===
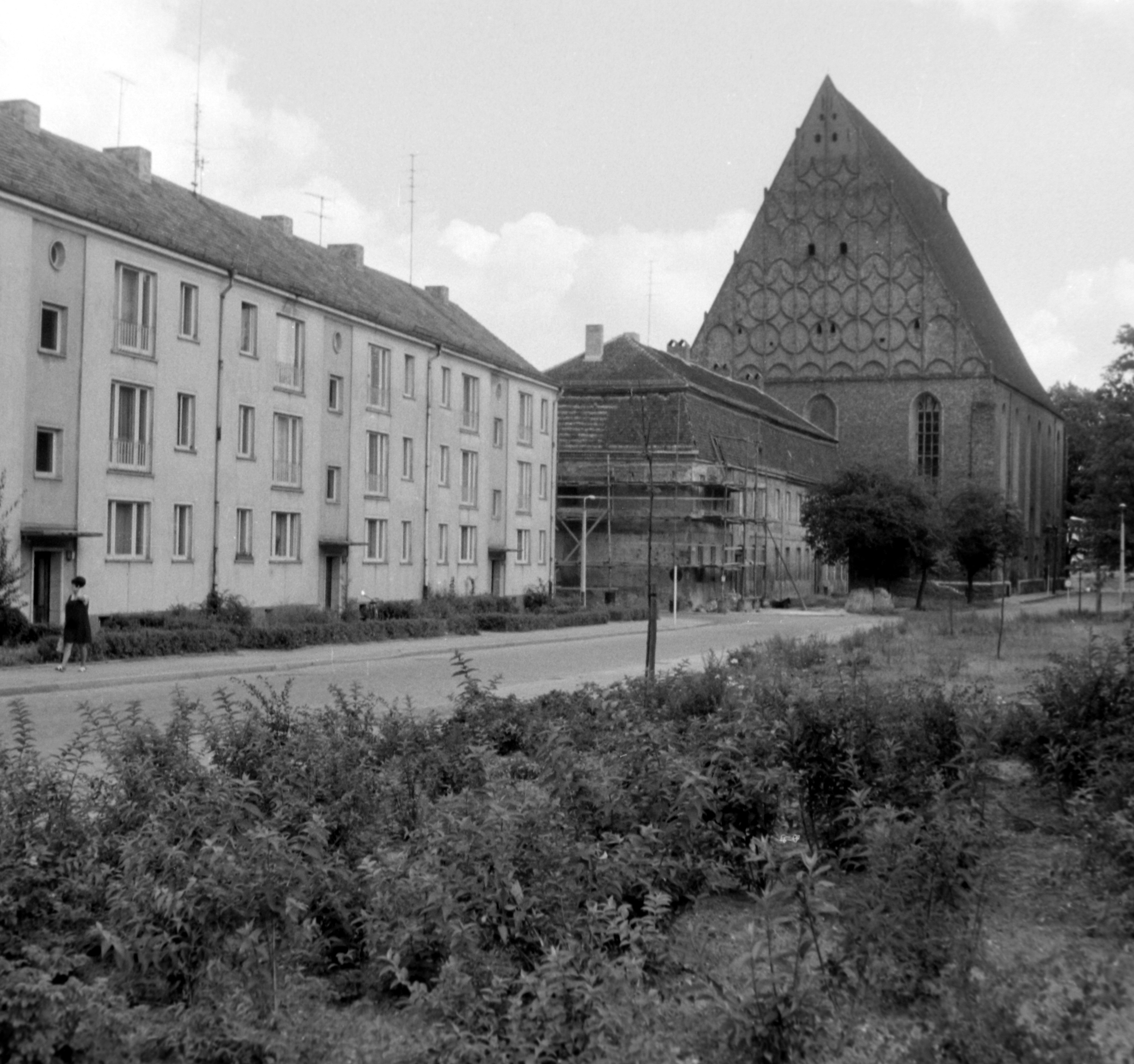
Former Franciscan church, later Konzerthalle Carl Philipp Emanuel Bach Frankfurt (Oder) (1967)

From 1963 to 1970 Hauschild was musical director at the Kleist Theater and permanent conductor of the Brandenburgisches Staatsorchester Frankfurt. His tasks there extended accordingly to both the musical theater and the concert series. His repertoire included, among others, Verdi, Mozart and Bizet. In 1966 he conducted the Kurt Hübenthal's production of Georg Friedrich Handel's opera Serse. He was also responsible for the world premiere of the symphonic work Schwedter Impulse by Nikolai Badinski as well as the GDR premiere of the opera Der zerbrochene Krug by Zbynik Vostrak and The Rake's Progress by Stravinsky. Because of its proximity to Berlin, as Hauschild explained, renowned singers such as Reiner Süß could be won for roles. With the politician Erich Mückenberger, Hauschild at the time advocated a new venue, the future Konzerthalle Carl Philipp Emanuel Bach.

=== Engagement by the Berliner Rundfunk ===
In 1971 Hauschild was engaged at the Berliner Rundfunk, where he first conducted the Rundfunkchor Berlin. From 1973 to 1976 he was representative of Heinz Rögner at the Rundfunk-Sinfonieorchester Berlin. On the radio he met Helmut Koch again, a "fateful acquaintance", as he would later remember. So he represented him at the world premiere of Fritz Geißler's Oratorium Schöpfer Mensch. Further premieres at the MaerzMusik in Berlin were to follow, among others in 1975 Jürgen Wilbrandt's Mein Haus hat Erde und Meer (speaker Horst Westphal) and Ruth Zechlin's Klavierkonzert (with Eva Ander), 1976 Wolfgang Strauß' 4. Sinfonie mit Sopran-Solo (with Renate Frank-Reinecke) and Siegfried Matthus' Laudate pacem (with Renate Krahmer, Elisabeth Breul, Annelies Burmeister, Armin Ude and Hermann Christian Polster) and in 1977 Köhler's Der gefesselte Orpheus and Lothar Voigtländer's Canto General (with Brigita Šulcová).

In 1976 Hauschild succeeded Herbert Kegel as leader of the Deutsche Streicherphilharmonie. Even after his move to Leipzig, he cultivated the connection to the capital and was a guest conductor at the Deutsche Staatsoper and the Komische Oper Berlin. Thus he took over the musical direction of the Götz Friedrich's production of Verdi's Il trovatore.

=== Choral conducting with the RSO and Rundfunkchor Leipzig ===
After conducting works by Luciano Berio in Leipzig in late 1977, Hauschild became principal conductor of the MDR Leipzig Radio Symphony Orchestra and in parallel head of the MDR Rundfunkchor Leipzig. He was able to assert himself against the Leipzig general music director Rolf Reuter and the Halle music director Thomas Sanderling, all of whom had been engaged as guest conductors by Hauschild's predecessor Herbert Kegel. In Leipzig, Hauschild maintained the First Viennese School, thus he continued the "Mozartiana" series begun by Kegel. He also continued to put Concert performances on the programme (Janáček, Wagner, and others). On the other hand, he brought with the symphony orchestra and the chamber orchestra various Neue Musik works to world premieres – 1978 Edison Denisov' Konzert für Klavier und Orchester (with Günter Philipp), 1979 Lombardi's Sinfonie, Neubert's Notturno, Lohse's Konzert für Klavier und Orchester (with Gerhard Erber) and Dessau's Vierzehn Stücke aus "Internationale Kriegsfibel" (with Helga Termer, Elisabeth Wilke, Horst Gebhardt and Bernd Elze), 1980 Katzer's Konzert für Klavier und Orchester (with Rolf-Dieter Arens) and Wallmann's Stadien für Orchester und Klavier (with Bettina Otto), 1981 Schenker's "Fanal Spanien 1936", 1983 Lombardis Zweite Sinfonie and Krätzschmar's Heine-Szenen (with Wolfgang Hellmich). He was also responsible for several DDR premieres, such as Ives's Holiday Symphony in 1979 , as well as Zimmermann's Pax Questuosa and Dittrich's Etym in 1984. Like Kegel before him, he always placed contemporary music before Beethoven's 9th Symphony at the end of the season. Moreover, he again invited composer-conductors to Leipzig, such as Milko Kelemen, Ernst Krenek and Witold Lutosławski. With the 1979/80 season he introduced weekly morning concerts in the Kongreßhalle Leipzig. After the opening of the Neue Gewandhaus in Leipzig in 1981, the Rundfunkorchester played regularly in the new concert building. This was followed by an increase in the number of concerts. Hauschild made several recordings with the orchestra, ranging from the music of Telemann and Schumann to Ives, Denissow, Thiele and Krätzschmar, including the complete choral works of Johannes Brahms and several oratorios by Handel. Extensive guest performances took him to such places as the Soviet Union (with the orchestra) and Japan. After his departure from Leipzig, it took two seasons before the leadership positions could be filled again with Max Pommer (orchestra) and Jörg-Peter Weigle (choir).

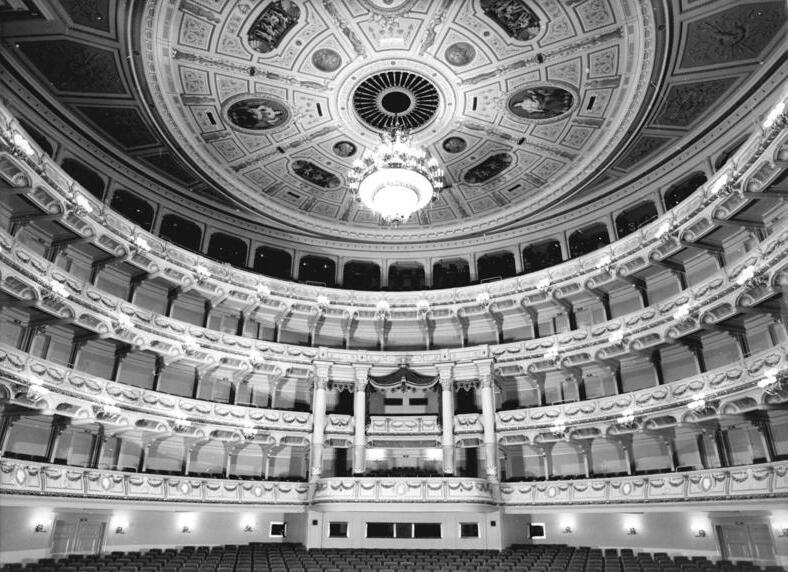
The Semperoper in Dresden (1985)

In the course of his opera performances in Leipzig, Berlin and Dresden, Hauschild became the "Wagner conductor of the hour" by the mid-1980s, as Robert Schuppert put it. At the turn of the year 1984/85, he conducted the orchestra which performed in the Palast der Republik in Berlin, performing Beethoven's Symphony No. 9, with the Leipziger Rundfunkklangkörper and soloists Reiner Goldberg, Magdalena Falewicz, Uta Priew and Hermann Christian Polster, this performance being broadcast live on the first channel of the Deutscher Fernsehfunk. Hauschild became internationally known in February 1985 through the television broadcast of the Joachim Herz' production of Weber's Der Freischütz, which he presented on the occasion of the Commemoration of 13 February 1945 in Dresden (40th anniversary of the destruction of Dresden) for the reopening of the Semperoper. His conducting was highly praised by John Rockwell in the New York Times. The Dresden musicologist Dieter Härtwig (2007) rated Hauschild "among the leading conductors in the GDR".

=== Relocation to the BRD and Stuttgart ===
After an originally promised double engagement Leipzig-Stuttgart did not come about due to "the rigid attitude of the GDR authorities", as Jörg Clemen explained, Hauschild settled in Stuttgart in spring 1985 on the occasion of a guest performance. There he became Generalmusikdirektor and chief conductor at the beginning of the 1985/86 season of the Stuttgarter Philharmoniker. In a statement, he explained that in the summer of 1984, the city of Stuttgart approached him with the request for a permanent guest conducting position, whereby he would take over some of Hans Zanotelli's tasks. After the GDR authorities agreed to this, he agreed in Stuttgart. In April 1985, however, he realized that the GDR authorities "were no longer fully committed to their promise". He felt that he had a duty to the orchestra members and to the Stuttgart city administration and decided "with a heavy heart" to move to the BRD. In the GDR, on the other hand, he was declared persona non grata and was henceforth also known among fellow musicians as a notorious "class enemy"; his family only received permission to leave the country two years later. In 1985, Hauschild conducted the premiere in the Stuttgart Liederhalle, of Kelemen's Phantasmen (with Eckart Schloifer) and in 1987 Yun I-sang's 2. Violin Concerto (with Akiko Tatsumi). Concert tours with the philharmonic took him to Europe, Japan and the USA. According to the cultural journalist Frank Armbruster, he took the orchestra "to a high point in its history. In the end, however, Hauschild left Stuttgart because "he had not succeeded in convincing the city of the need for additional orchestra positions for the Philharmonic," as Armbruster remarked.

In addition to his engagement in Stuttgart, he was guest conductor of the Niedersächsisches Staatsorchester Hannover, with which he premiered Kelemen's Archetypon in 1986. In 1986 he conducted the Staatsorchester Stuttgart bei der Loriot-Inszenierung von Flatows's Martha am Staatstheater Stuttgart. With the NDR Radiophilharmonie oblag ihm 1992 die Uraufführungen von Tal's 6. Sinfonie.

=== Director at the Aalto-Theater in Essen ===
In 1991 Hauschild became conductor of the Saalbau Essen and in 1992 additionally artistic director and general music director of the Aalto-Theater, a dual function created especially for him. During his term of office the orchestra was awarded the prize "Best Concert Programme of the Season" 1991/92 by the Deutscher Musikverleger-Verband. Under his leadership the ballets Giselle by Adolphe Adam and Der grüne Tisch by Fritz Cohen, as well as the operas Lady Macbeth von Mzensk by Dmitri Shostakovich and Tosca by Puccini, were staged. At the Aalto Theatre, however, he devoted himself above all to the works of Richard Wagner; he had Parsifal (1991/92) and Tristan und Isolde (1992/93) performed there. After seventy years, from 1994 to 1997, together with the director Klaus Dieter Kirst, whom he knew from Dresden, he brought the tetralogy Der Ring des Nibelungen to the stage. Already in GDR times, he had developed a "love for Wagner" through the symphonic works of Bruckner and Mahler, which, however, had to remain "platonic" for a long time, as he explained in an earlier interview. Hauschild also turned his attention to contemporary Eastern European music, premiering Suslin's Farewell in 1993 and Denissow's Concerto for Flute, Clarinet and Orchestra (with Dagmar Becker and Wolfgang Meyer) in 1996. His engagement in Essen ended in 1997.

From 1998 to 2001 he was a freelancer. He also was active conductor e.g. at the Orchestra della Svizzera Italiana in Lugano.

=== Chief conductor in Halle (Saale) and Rostock ===
From 2001 to 2004 he was the successor of the permanent guest conductor Bernhard Klee and chief conductor of the Philharmonisches Staatsorchester Halle. In 2003 he premiered Jean-Christophe Marti's H aspiré at the Neues Theater Halle. With reference to the planned orchestra merger, which he rejected, he ended his engagement with the Philharmonic State Orchestra early.

Besides his engagement in Halle, he was Generalmusikdirektor of the Volkstheater Rostock and Chefdirigent of the Norddeutsche Philharmonie Rostock from August 2002 until 2004, where he became a permanent guest conductor in 2000. Because, as he later explained, he could not find "an artistic and human consensus" with the artistic director Steffen Piontek, he left the orchestra.

Hauschild had been a guest conductor in Switzerland, Austria, Italy, Spain, Finland, Taiwan and other countries.

== Teaching commitments ==
After having studied at the Hochschule für Musik "Hanns Eisler" in Berlin and the University of Music and Theatre Leipzig Hauschild initially held teaching posts, and was appointed professor for orchestra conducting at both music academies in 1981. In 1988 he became professor for orchestra conducting at the State University of Music and Performing Arts Stuttgart. Hauschild also taught as professor of conducting from 1989 to 2003 at the Hochschule für Musik Karlsruhe.

In 1983 he founded the "Seminar for Young Opera Conductors" in Altenburg. Repeatedly he was then also artistic director for orchestral conducting at the Dirigentenforum of the Deutscher Musikrat (Essen 1994, Koblenz 1998 and 2005, Halle (Saale) 2001, Rostock 2002 and 2004 and Bremen 2006). In the winter semester 2005/06 and the summer semester 2007 he was Docent for auditions in the orchestra / symphony concert at Orchesterzentrum NRW.

Among his students were Michael Gläser, Constantin Trinks and Hendrik Vestmann.

== Personal life and death ==
Hauschild, a Protestant, married in 1959 and was the father of two children. His son Thomas Hauschild (born 1964) is a professor of horn at the University of Music and Theatre Leipzig.

Hauschild died in Leipzig on 18 May 2023, at the age of 85.

== Awards ==
Culture prizes

- 1975: Critics' Prize of the Berliner Zeitung for the directing of Emil Petrovic's's Opera Lysistrata at the Staatsoper Unter den Linden
- 1977: Art Prize of the German Democratic Republic
- 1984: National Prize of the German Democratic Republic III. Klasse für Kunst und Literatur "for his outstanding achievements as principal conductor of the Rundfunk-Sinfonieorchester Leipzig and the Rundfunkchor Leipzig as well as for his groundbreaking interpretations of works of the classical heritage and for the cultivation of the contemporary music of the GDR in the field of choral symphony"

Record prizes

- 1991: Quarterly list 1/1991 of the Preis der deutschen Schallplattenkritik for the Clarinet Concertos by Wolfgang Amadeus Mozart, Joseph von Eybler and Franz Xaver Süßmayr
- 1993: Quarterly List 3/1993 of the German Record Critics' Prize for Sinfonie concertanti by François Devienne
- 199?: Choc of Le Monde de la musique for Sämtliche Chorwerke a cappella und mit Instrumentalbegleitung by Johannes Brahms

Other honours

- 1966: Ernst-Moritz-Arndt-Medaille
- 2004: Honorary conductor of the Norddeutsche Philharmonie Rostock

== Compositions ==
Hauschild composed incidental music for the following works:

- Die Insel Gottes (Manfred Richter)
- Much Ado About Nothing (Shakespeare)
- Faust I (Johann Wolfgang von Goethe)
- Krasnaja šapočka (Evgeny Schwartz)
- Repka (Vladimir Mayakovsky)
- Des Teufels drei goldene Haare (Horst Ulrich Wendler)
- Prinz Friedrich von Homburg (Heinrich von Kleist)
- Antigona a tí druhí (Peter Karvaš)

== Discography ==
Harpsichordist

- 1974: Joseph Haydn: The Creation (Eterna) with the Rundfunkchor Berlin, the Rundfunkchor and the Rundfunk-Sinfonieorchester Berlin under Helmut Koch; soloists: Regina Werner, Peter Schreier, Theo Adam
- 1975: Georg Friedrich Händel: Music for the Royal Fireworks among others (Eterna) with the Kammerorchester Berlin under Helmut Koch
- 1975: Georg Friedrich Händel: Messias (Eterna) with the Rundfunk-Solistenvereinigung, the Rundfunkchor and the Rundfunk-Sinfonie-Orchester Berlin under Helmut Koch; soloists: Regina Werner, Heidi Rieß, Peter Schreier, Theo Adam

Conductor

- 1979: Sergei Prokofiev: Alexander Newski (Eterna) with the Rundfunkchor, the Rundfunk-Solistenvereinigung and the Rundfunk-Sinfonie-Orchester Berlin; soloist: Ingeborg Springer
- 1980: Edisson Denissow: Konzert für Klavier und Orchester / Peinture (Nova) with the MDR Leipzig Radio Symphony Orchestra and Berlin; soloist: Günter Philipp
- 1980: Johannes Brahms: Fest- und Gedenksprüche / Motetten Op. 29, 74, 110 (Eterna) with the Rundfunkchor Leipzig
- 1981: Georg Philipp Telemann: Burlesque de Quixotte / Ouvertüre der Konzertsuite F-Dur (Eterna) with the Rundfunk-Sinfonie-Orchester and the Rundfunk-Kammerorchester Leipzig
- 1982: Charles Ives: A Symphony: New England Holidays / Central Park in the Dark (Eterna) with the Rundfunk-Sinfonie-Orchester Leipzig
- 1982: Johann Joachim Quantz, Domenico Cimarosa, Carl Stamitz: Flötenkonzerte (Eterna) with the Rundfunk Kammerorchester Leipzig; soloist: Werner Tast
- 1983: Johannes Brahms: Lieder und Romanzen (Eterna) with the Rundfunkchor Leipzig
- 1983: Joseph Haydn, Johann Nepomuk Hummel, Vincenzo Bellini: Oboenkonzerte (Eterna) with the Rundfunk-Kammerorchester Leipzig; soloist: Burkhard Glaetzner
- 1983: Johannes Brahms: Deutsche Volkslieder (Eterna) with the Rundfunkchor Leipzig
- 1984: Georg Friedrich Händel: Hercules (Eterna) with the Rundfunkchor and the Rundfunk-Sinfonie-Orchester Leipzig; soloists: Kari Lövaas, Doris Soffel, Hebe Dijkstra, Eberhard Büchner, Hermann Christian Polster, Rolf Tomaszewski
- 1984: Georg Friedrich Händel: Israel in Egypt (Eterna) with the Rundfunkchor and the Rundfunk-Sinfonie-Orchester Leipzig; soloists: Carola Nossek, Petra-Ines Strate, Rosemarie Lang, Christian Vogel, Siegfried Lorenz, Gothart Stier
- 1984: Johannes Brahms: Geistliche Chorwerke (Eterna) with the Rundfunkchor and the Rundfunk-Sinfonie-Orchester Leipzig; soloists: Julia Schlegel, Heidi Rieß
- 1984: Robert Schumann: Das Paradies und die Peri (Eterna) with the Rundfunkchor and the Rundfunk-Sinfonie-Orchester Leipzig; soloists: Magdaléna Hajóssyová, Marga Schiml, Eberhard Büchner, Hermann Christian Polster among others.
- 1984: Wilfried Krätzschmar: Explosionen und Cantus among others (Nova) with the Rundfunk-Sinfonie-Orchester Leipzig
- 1984: Johannes Brahms: Kanons und Chöre / Volkskinderlieder (Eterna) with the Rundfunkchor Leipzig; soloists: Edith Mathis, Karl Engel
- 1985: Carl Maria von Weber: Der Freischütz (Eterna) with the choir of the Staatsoper and the Staatskapelle Dresden
- 1985: Friedrich Schenker: Flötensinfonie (Nova) with the Rundfunk-Sinfonie-Orchester Leipzig; soloist: Werner Tast
- 1990: Max Reger: Violinkonzert A-Dur (Amati) with the Stuttgarter Philharmoniker; soloist: Edith Peinemann
- 1991: Wolfgang Amadeus Mozart, Joseph von Eybler, Franz Xaver: Klarinettenkonzerte (Novalis) with the English Chamber Orchestra; soloist Dieter Klöcker
- 1993: François Devienne: Sinfonie Concertanti (Koch-Schwann) with the Consortium Classicum and the NDR Radiophilharmonie
- 1995: Siegfried Thiele: Übungen im Verwandeln among others (Wergo) with the Rundfunksinfonie-Orchester Leipzig
- 1997: Johannes Brahms: Sämtliche Chorwerke a cappella und mit Instrumentalbegleitung (Orfeo) with the Leipziger Rundfunkchor and instrumental soloists
- 1998: Gloria Coates: Symphony No. 2 among others (Classic Produktion Osnabrück) with the Stuttgarter Philharmoniker
- 2000: Ferdinand Hérold: Overtures and Symphonies (Dynamic) with the Orchestra della Svizzera Italiana
- 2001: François-Joseph Gossec: Symphonie à 17 parties (Naxos) with the Orchestra della Svizzera italiana

== Literature ==
- Günther Buch: Namen und Daten wichtiger Personen der DDR. 4th revised and extended edition. Dietz, Berlin among others. 1987, ISBN 3-8012-0121-X, p. 109.
- Carl Dahlhaus, Hans Heinrich Eggebrecht (ed.): Brockhaus Riemann Musiklexikon. In vier Bänden und einem Ergänzungsband. Supplementary volume: A–Z. 2., revised and extended edition, Schott, Mainz 1995, ISBN 3-7957-8359-3.
- Vera Grützner: Musiker in Brandenburg vom 16. Jahrhundert bis zur Gegenwart. Jaron, Berlin 2004, ISBN 3-89773-507-5, p. 106.
- Walter Habel (ed.): Wer ist wer? Das deutsche who's who. 43rd edition (2004/05), Schmidt-Römhild, Lübeck 2004, ISBN 3-7950-2038-7, p. 534.
- Hella Kaden: Hauschild, Wolf-Dieter. In Gabriele Baumgartner, Dieter Hebig (ed.): Biographisches Handbuch der SBZ, DDR. 1945–1990. Vol. 1: Abendroth–Lyr. Saur, Munich 1996, ISBN 3-598-11176-2, p. 285.
- Steffen Lieberwirth (ed.): Mitteldeutscher Rundfunk. Die Geschichte des Sinfonieorchesters. Written on behalf of the Mitteldeutscher Rundfunk by Jörg Clemen, Kamprad, Altenburg 1999, ISBN 3-930550-09-1, pp. 132ff.
- Wulf Mämpel: Vorhang auf! 25 Jahre Aalto-Oper. Die Essener Oper ist ein Gesamtkunstwerk und Botschafterin der Musik. Edited by Norbert Beleke, Beleke, Essen 2013, ISBN 978-3-8215-0637-1, pp. 60ff.
- Wolf-Dieter Hausschild, in Internationales Biographisches Archiv 14/2005 dated 9 April 2005 (hy), in Munzinger-Archiv (start of article freely accessible)
- Alain Pâris: Klassische Musik im 20. Jahrhundert. Instrumentalisten, Sänger, Dirigenten, Orchester, Chöre. 2nd völlig überarbeitete Auflage, Deutscher Taschenbuch Verlag, Munich 1997, ISBN 3-423-32501-1, p. 342.
- Axel Schniederjürgen (Red.): Kürschners Musiker-Handbuch. Solisten, Dirigenten, Komponisten, Hochschullehrer. 5th edition, Saur, Munich 2006, ISBN 3-598-24212-3, p. 171.
- Nicolas Slonimsky, Laura Kuhn, Dennis McIntire: Hauschild, Wolf-Dieter. In Laura Kuhn (eed.): Baker's Biographical Dictionary of Musicians. Vol. 3: Haar–Levi. 9th edition, Schirmer Reference, New York 2001, ISBN 0-02-865528-1, p. 90.
