= Regina Werner-Dietrich =

German operatic soprano

Regina Werner-Dietrich (née Werner; born 9 April 1950) is a German operatic soprano and vocal pedagogue. She is professor emerita of classical singing at the University of Music and Theatre Leipzig.

== Life ==
Born in Zwickau, Werner grew up in a musical family, her father was Kapellmeister. She attended the Thomasschule zu Leipzig from 1964 to 1968 and then studied at the University of Music and Theatre Leipzig with Eva Fleischer until 1973. She won 2nd prize at the International Johann Sebastian Bach Competition in 1972. From 1974 to 1987, Werner was a soloist with the Leipzig Gewandhaus Orchestra, which was conducted by Kurt Masur during this time. She performed regularly at the Gewandhaus, both as part of the Grand Concerts and on Liederabend. At St. Thomas Church, Leipzig, she sang in particular cantatas and oratorios by Johann Sebastian Bach with the Thomanerchor. She went on concert tours in Europe and East Asia with the Gewandhaus Orchestra and the St Thomas's Boys' Choir.

As a guest Werner sang among others at the Komische Oper Berlin, the Oper Leipzig and Semperoper in Dresden. Her opera and operetta repertoire included Susanna in The Marriage of Figaro, the Queen of the Night in The Magic Flute, Marzelline in Fidelio, Norina in Don Pasquale, Gilda in Rigoletto, Adele in the Die Fledermaus and Sophie in Der Rosenkavalier. She has participated in radio, television and sound recordings, among others the complete recordings of the Handel Oratorio Semele, Messiah and Salomon as well as Haydn's The Creation with the Rundfunk-Sinfonieorchester Berlin for the Eterna record label. She bears the honorary title Kammersängerin.

Having already held a teaching position at the Hochschule für Musik "Felix Mendelssohn-Bartholdy" Leipzig, Werner became a permanent lecturer in 1987 and was appointed professor in 1993. For a time she was dean of Faculty of the Hochschule. She also gave national and international master classes, among others at the Conservatoire de Paris (CNSMDP) and at the Maîtrise Notre Dame de Paris. Her students include Eun Yee You, Mandy Fredrich, Diana Schnürpel, Nadja Mchantaf, Olena Tokar and Elsa Dreisig. On the occasion of her retirement, the Leipzig Academy of Music awarded Werner-Dietrich an honorary professorship in 2015. Even after retirement, she continued her annual, highly frequented operetta course.

== Recording (selection) ==
- 1974: Joseph Haydn, Die Schöpfung. Mit Rundfunk-Sinfonieorchester Berlin, Rundfunkchor Berlin, Helmut Koch, Heidi Rieß, Peter Schreier, Theo Adam.
- 1974: Georg Friedrich Handel, Semele. Mit Rundfunk-Sinfonieorchester Berlin, Rundfunkchor Berlin, Helmut Koch, Eberhard Büchner, Siegfried Lorenz, Fritz Hübner, Gisela Pohl.
- 1975: Georg Friedrich Händel, Der Messias. Mit Rundfunk-Sinfonieorchester Berlin, Rundfunkchor Berlin, Helmut Koch, Heidi Rieß, Peter Schreier, Theo Adam.
- 1975: Johann Sebastian Bach, Kantaten Wir danken dir, Gott und Preise, Jerusalem, den Herrn. Mit Thomanerchor, Gewandhausorchester, Hans-Joachim Rotzsch, Heidi Rieß, Hermann Christian Polster.
- 1975: Johann Sebastian Bach, Kantaten Durchlauchtster Leopold, BWV 173a und Erhöhtes Fleisch und Blut. Mit Thomanerchor, Gewandhausorchester, Hans-Joachim Rotzsch, Heidi Rieß, Siegfried Lorenz, Hermann Christian Polster.
- 1978: Johann Sebastian Bach, Kantaten Gottes Zeit ist die allerbeste Zeit und Ach wie flüchtig, ach wie nichtig. Mit Thomanerchor, Gewandhausorchester, Hans-Joachim Rotzsch, Rosemarie Lang, Peter Schreier, Dieter Weimann, Hermann Christian Polster.
- 1981: Georg Friedrich Händel, Salomo. Mit Rundfunk-Sinfonieorchester Berlin, Rundfunkchor Berlin, Heinz Rögner, Marga Schiml, Eva-Maria Bundschuh, Helga Termer, Sibylle Suske, Eberhard Büchner, Hermann Christian Polster.
