= Günter Philipp =

German pianist, musicologist, composer and painter 1927–2021

Günter Philipp (13 September 1927 – 10 July 2021) was a German pianist, musicologist, composer and amateur painter.

== Life ==
Born in Sohland an der Spree, Philipp grew up in Riesa, Oppach and Bautzen. Attracted by music and figure drawing, he was instructed by Rudolf Warnecke in nature study and visual art. In post-war Germany, forced labour damaged his left hand. Nevertheless, he became a student in Leipzig in 1947, a pupil of Hugo Steurer (piano) and Wilhelm Weismann (composition). In 1948, he was able to enrol at the University of Music and Theatre Leipzig and begin studying with Heinz Eberhard Strüning. For financial reasons, he had to break off his studies in 1949 and make a living as a freelance artist in Oppach. He completed his studies, which he resumed in 1953, with the Staatsexamen in 1956.

Philipp died in Weinböhla on 10 July 2021.

=== Musician and piano teacher ===
Philipp made radio and recordings, gave solo recitals, acted as Lied accompanist, chamber musician and soloist in orchestral concerts. He championed contemporary music and premiered many works, including the Piano Concerto by Edison Denisov dedicated to him and works by Alfred Schnittke and Christfried Schmidt. He edited piano works by Denisov, Alexander Scriabin, Maurice Ravel and Anatoly Lyadov.

Philipp had been a lecturer at the Hochschule für Musik Carl Maria von Weber Dresden since 1972 (cf. section on Real Socialist Culture) and was one of the first musicians to practice solo improvisation publicly in the GDR in the 1960s, founding the first improvisation group with soprano Barbara Dollfus. As a passionate improvisationist, he often performed with orchestral and jazz musicians, including Ute Pruggmayer-Philipp. He was in professional exchange with piano makers. He gave countless courses in Altenburg, Wrocław and Bechyně, after 1989 also in Sweden and Japan.

=== Painting ===
In addition to music, he always devoted himself to painting and graphic art. Oskar Kokoschka, Emil Nolde, Edvard Munch and Oskar Behringer inspired him. Later, he was mainly influenced by impressions of informalism and action painting from art books by his Dessau friend Eberhard Dutschmann, whose works were concealed in the GDR for forty years.

=== Real Socialist Culture ===
Again and again, Philipp came up against political limits. He applied unsuccessfully for membership of the piano building. He was therefore only able to exhibit his work as an exception. Apart from one brief exception, he was not listed in the catalogue of offers of the Künstler-Agentur der DDR.

After the Berlin Wall was built, he also had to do without in music. He was not allowed to accept invitations to concert tours abroad, often not even to Eastern Bloc countries. The piano department of the Leipzig Academy of Music was headed by the long-serving Rector Rudolf Fisher and his students. Against such opposition, Philipp did not succeed in establishing improvisation as a subject. In vain, he criticised the practices of appointments at the Ministry of Culture. Werner Wolf repeatedly spoke up for Philipp and would have liked to have him join the Department of Musicology / Music Education at the Leipzig University as a successor to the composer Werner Richter, who died in 1970. But for this, Philipp would have had to join the Socialist Unity Party of Germany, which was out of the question for him.

In 1972, he accepted a lectureship in piano performance and improvisation at the Hochschule für Musik Carl Maria von Weber Dresden. It was not until 1990, after the so-called Peaceful Revolution, that he was appointed artistic professor. As head of the piano department, he was able to realise some of his ideas in education. Two years later, after his retirement, they were abolished again.

=== Federal German Culture Industry ===
No less than the restrictions in the GDR, he deplores phenomena in today's music and teaching business. Rigorous elbow mentality, clique economy, corruption, mobbing, overestimation of one's own abilities, defamation of professional colleagues, refusal to share experiences, biased examination assessments, poor psychological and methodological skills, rejection of scientific knowledge and superficial careerism.

== Honours ==
- Honorary President of the German Association of Musicians in Saxony.

== Work ==
=== Books ===
- Klavier, Klavierspiel, Improvisation. VEB Deutscher Verlag für Musik, 1984
- Klavierspiel und Improvisation. Ein Lehr- und Bekenntnisbuch über musikalische, technische und psychologische Grundlagen (Interpretation, Übung, Pedal, Unterricht, Kreativität, Hygiene, Akustik, Klavierbau u. a.). Altenburg Leipzig 2003
- bilderklang klangbilder – Malerei und Grafik, catalogue, Dresden 2007

=== Paintings ===
- Vers la flamme after Scriabin's op. 72
- Hommage à Edison Denisov

=== Recordings ===
- Improvisatorische Kontraste: Solo- u. Gruppen-Improvisationen. Eterna 827574
- Klavierimprovisationen mit Ute Pruggmayer-Philipp und Günter Philipp. Berlin Classics 0032042BC
- Edison Denisov: Konzert für Klavier und Orchester / Peinture. Rundfunk-Sinfonieorchester Leipzig / Rundfunk-Sinfonieorchester Berlin, Leitung: Wolf-Dieter Hauschild. Edel Company Hamburg, Berlin Classics 9260-2
- Alexander Skriabin: Klavierwerke. Edel Company Hamburg, Berlin Classics 3070-2
