= Michael Gläser =

German singer and choir director

- Born: 2 November 1957 (age 68); Karl-Marx-Stadt, East Germany
- Education: Thomanerchor; Hochschule für Musik und Theater "Felix Mendelssohn Bartholdy" Leipzig
- Occupations: Conductor; Singer; Choral conductor; Academic teacher
- Organizations: Rundfunkchor Berlin; Choir of Bayerischer Rundfunk; Hochschule für Musik und Theater München

Michael Gläser (born 2 November 1957) is a German singer, choral conductor and academic teacher. He was artistic director of broadcasters' choirs including the Rundfunkchor Berlin and the choir of the Bayerischer Rundfunk. He has been professor of choral conducting and Protestant church music at the Hochschule für Musik und Theater München from 1994. Two recordings for which he conducted a choir were nominated for the Grammy Awards.

== Life ==
Born in Chemnitz (then Karl-Marx-Stadt), Gläser attended the Thomasschule zu Leipzig from 1967 to 1978 where he was a member of the Thomanerchor. He studied voice with Heidi Rieß and conducting with Andreas Pieske, Wolf-Dieter Hauschild and Dietrich Knothe at the Hochschule für Musik und Theater "Felix Mendelssohn Bartholdy" Leipzig and the Hochschule für Musik "Hanns Eisler" Berlin from 1978 to 1985.

He conducted the GewandhausChor, the Berliner Singakademie and the MDR Rundfunkchor in Leipzig, where he was also active as a singer. In 1986, he became assistant to Dietrich Knothe at the Rundfunkchor Berlin. From 1990 to 2005 he was artistic director of the Chor des Bayerischen Rundfunks. From 1998, the choir held subscription concerts at the Prinzregententheater. He remained a guest conductor of the choir.

In 2014, Gläser stepped in for the sick Thomaskantor Georg Christoph Biller and led the Thomanerchor as interim cantor for a quarter of a year. During this time, he conducted the weekly Motette concerts as well as concerts with the Gewandhaus Orchestra.

Since 1994, Gläser has been professor of choral conducting at the Hochschule für Musik und Theater München. He is also head of the Department of Protestant Church Music. In 2003, he founded the Bayerischer Rundfunk Choral Conductors Forum.

== Awards ==
Recordings with Gläser were nominated twice for the Grammy Awards in the category Best Choral Performance, for the 42nd Annual Grammy Awards in 1999 for Schmidt's Das Buch mit sieben Siegeln, and for the 50th Annual Grammy Awards in 2007 for Schönberg's Gurre-Lieder, with the Choir of the Bavarian Radio and the MDR Radio Choir Leipzig, conducted by Howard Arman.
