= Ach wie flüchtig, ach wie nichtig, BWV 26 =

Church cantata by Johann Sebastian Bach

Ach wie flüchtig, ach wie nichtig
- BWV 26
- Chorale cantata by J. S. Bach
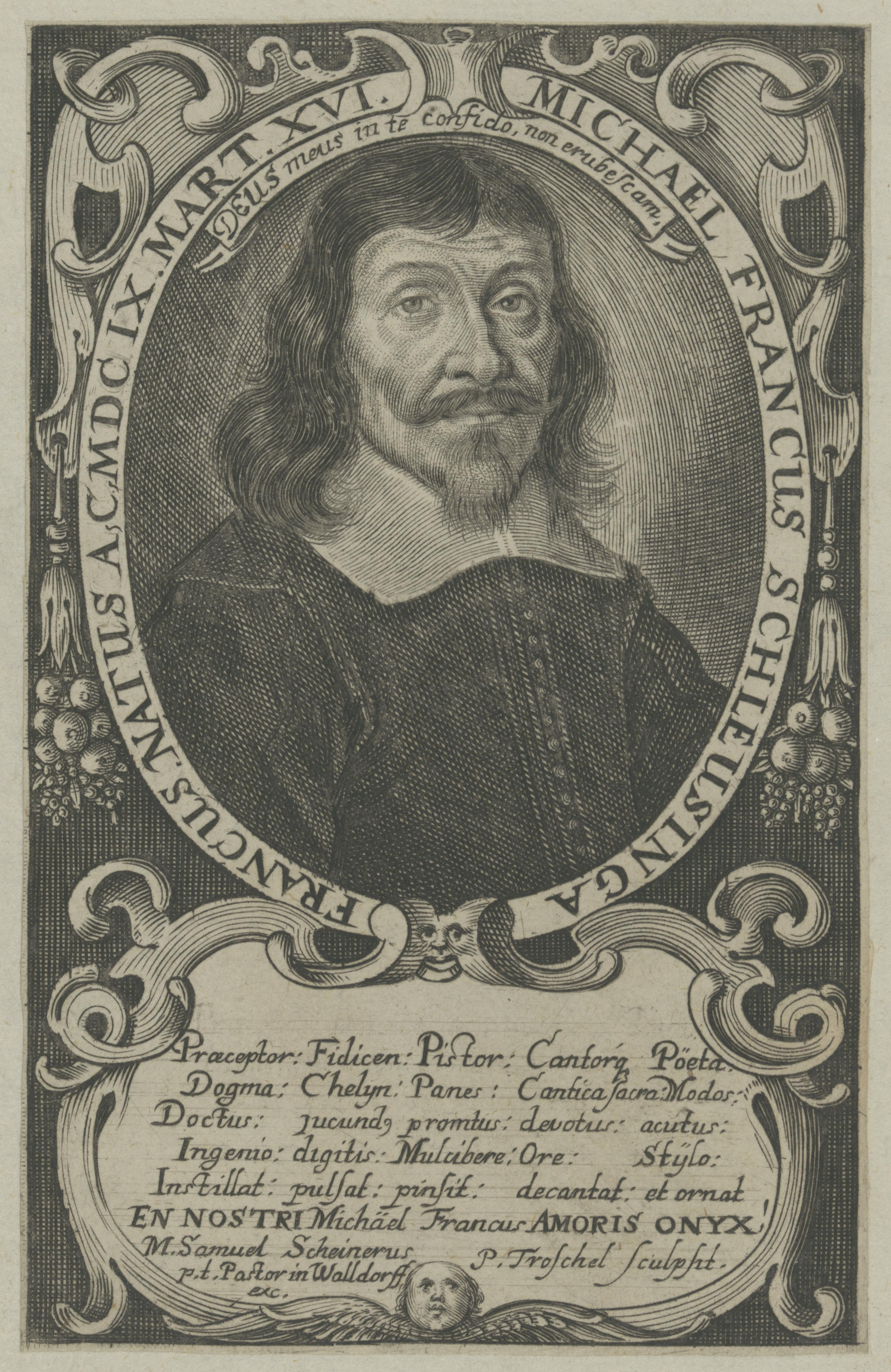
- Michael Franck, author of the hymn's text and melody
- Occasion: 24th Sunday after Trinity
- Chorale: "Ach wie flüchtig, ach wie nichtig" by Michael Franck
- Performed: 19 November 1724
- Movements: 6
- Vocal: SATB choir and solo
- Instrumental: horn; flauto traverso; 3 oboes; 2 violins; viola; organ; continuo

Ach wie flüchtig, ach wie nichtig (Ah, how fleeting, ah how insignificant), BWV 26, is a church cantata by Johann Sebastian Bach. He composed the chorale cantata in Leipzig for the 24th Sunday after Trinity and first performed it on 19 November 1724.

The cantata is based upon the hymn "Ach wie flüchtig, ach wie nichtig", versed and composed by Michael Franck in 1652. The tune was later edited by Johann Crüger. It is the only time Bach used this hymn, except BWV 644 (Orgelbüchlein). Its theme, the transience of human life, is the only connection to the prescribed gospel reading. The first and last stanza are used unchanged in both text and tune: the former is treated as a chorale fantasia, the latter as a four-part closing chorale. An unknown librettist paraphrased the inner stanzas as arias and recitatives. Bach scored the cantata for four vocal soloists, a four-part choir, and a Baroque instrumental ensemble of horn, flute, three oboes, strings and continuo.

== History and words ==
Bach wrote the cantata in 1724 in his second year in Leipzig for the 24th Sunday after Trinity. That year, Bach composed a chorale cantata cycle, begun on the first Sunday after Trinity. The prescribed readings for the Sunday were from the Epistle to the Colossians, a prayer for the Colossians (Colossians 1:9–14), and from the Gospel of Matthew, the story of the Raising of Jairus' daughter (Matthew 9:18–26). The cantata is based on "Ach wie flüchtig, ach wie nichtig", a hymn in 13 stanzas by Michael Franck (1652), to a melody by Johann Crüger (1661), "a meditation on the transience of human life and of all earthly goods". This aspect is the only connection to the gospel. An unknown poet retained the first and the last stanza unchanged the outer movements 1 and 6 of the cantata. He derived the four inner movements as a sequence of alternating arias and recitatives from the inner stanzas. John Eliot Gardiner points out that "several of Bach's late Trinity season cantatas" concentrate on "the brevity of human life and the futility of earthly hopes".

Bach first performed the cantata on 19 November 1724. It is the only time that he used this hymn.

== Music ==
=== Scoring and structure ===
Bach structured the cantata in six movements. The text and tune of the hymn appear unchanged in the outer choral movements, a chorale fantasia and a four-part closing chorale, which frame a sequence of alternating arias and recitatives. Bach scored the work for four vocal soloists (soprano, alto, tenor, bass), a four-part choir and a Baroque instrumental ensemble of a horn (Co) doubling the soprano in the chorale, flauto traverso (Ft), three oboes (Ob), two violins (Vl), viola (Va), organ (Org) and basso continuo (Bc).

In the following table of the movements, the scoring follows the Neue Bach-Ausgabe. The keys and time signatures are taken from Alfred Dürr, using the symbol for common time (4/4).

Movements of Ach wie flüchtig, ach wie nichtig
No.	Title	Text	Type	Vocal	Winds	Strings	Others	Key	Time
1	Ach wie flüchtig, ach wie nichtig	Franck	Chorale fantasia	SATB	Co Ft 3Ob	2Vl Va	Org Bc	A minor	common time
2	So schnell ein rauschend Wasser schießt	anon.	Aria	T	Ft	Vl	Org Bc	C major	6/8
3	Die Freude wird zur Traurigkeit	anon.	Recitative	A			Org Bc		common time
4	An irdische Schätze das Herze zu hängen	anon.	Aria	B	3Ob		Org Bc	E minor	common time
5	Die höchste Herrlichkeit und Pracht	anon	Recitative	S			Org Bc		common time
6	Ach wie flüchtig, ach wie nichtig	Franck	Chorale	SATB	Co Ft 3Ob	2Vl Va	Org Bc	A minor	common time

=== Music ===
The opening chorus, "Ach wie flüchtig, ach wie nichtig" (Ah, how fleeting, ah how insignificant), is a chorale fantasia. The instruments play concertante music, to which the soprano sings the cantus firmus line by line. The lower voices act as a "self-contained group", mostly in homophony, and "declaim the individual lines of text in unison at the end of each choral passage, using a melodic formula derived from the beginning of the hymn." Bach illustrates the imagery of the text, "fleetingness and insubstantiality" in motifs such as "abrupt chords separated by pauses and ... hurrying scale figures". Gardiner comments:

Long before the first statement of Franck's hymn (sopranos doubled by cornetto) Bach establishes the simile of man's life to a rising mist which will soon disperse. Fleet-footed scales, crossing and recrossing, joining and dividing, create a mood of phantasmal vapour.

The musicologist Julian Mincham compares the instrumental music to "mist and fog, images which imply movements of wind and air" and hears the lower voices as "evincing a feeling of primeval power and solidarity".

In the first aria, the text "So schnell ein rauschend Wasser schießt" (As quickly as rushing water) is illustrated in the flute, the violin and the tenor voice by "fast-flowing" music, "each musician required to keep changing functions – to respond, imitate, echo or double one another – while variously contributing to the insistent onwardness of the tumbling torrent".

In a recitative for alto, "Die Freude wird zur Traurigkeit" (Joy becomes sadness), images such as flowers speak of transience until the grave. The Bach scholar Klaus Hofmann describes it as a "far-reaching coloratura [which] culminates in an uneasy dissonance".

In the last aria, an "unusual oboe trio" accompanies the bass voice in "An irdische Schätze das Herze zu hängen" (To hang one's heart on earthly treasures). Gardiner comments: "He scores this Totentanz (Dance of the dead) for three oboes and continuo supporting his bass soloist in a mock bourrée", the oboes undermining in "throbbing accompaniment ... those earthly pleasures by which men are seduced", then representing "through jagged figures ... the tongues of flame which will soon reduce them to ashes, and finally in hurtling semiquaver scales of 6/4 chords ... surging waves which will tear all worldly things apart". Mincham sees a connection of the runs to those of movement 1, but points out how different their function is here:

now depicting thunder flames, stormy seas and the destruction of the world. The descending scales played in unison by the three oboes have great force. The vocalist has several prominent images, notably the long melisma on the word "zerschmettert" (shatter) and the weird, descending chromatic phrase towards the end, suggestive of a world of chaos and foolishness.

A recitative for soprano, "Die höchste Herrlichkeit und Pracht" (The highest glory and magnificence), expresses that even highest power will not escape death.

The closing chorale, "Ach wie flüchtig, ach wie nichtig" (Ah, how fleeting, ah how insignificant), is a four-part setting of the hymn's last stanza.

== Recordings ==
The listing is taken from the selection on the Bach Cantatas website. Instrumental groups playing period instruments in historically informed performances are highlighted green under the header Instr..

Recordings of Ach wie flüchtig, ach wie nichtig
Title	Conductor / Choir / Orchestra	Soloists	Label	Year	Instr.
Les Grandes Cantates de J. S. Bach Vol. 10	Fritz Werner Heinrich-Schütz-Chor Heilbronn Pforzheim Chamber Orchestra	Friederike Sailer; Claudia Hellmann; Helmut Krebs; Erich Wenk	Erato	1961	Chamber
Bach Cantatas Vol. 5 – Sundays after Trinity II	Karl Richter Münchener Bach-Chor Münchener Bach-Orchester	Ursula Buckel; Hertha Töpper; Ernst Haefliger; Theo Adam	Archiv Produktion	1966	
Bach Kantaten, Vol. 2: BWV 26, BWV 62, BWV 191	Diethard Hellmann Bachchor Mainz Bachorchester Mainz	Herrat Eicker; Marie-Luise Gilles; Alexander Young; Siegmund Nimsgern	DdM-Records Mitterteich 1968	1968	
J. S. Bach: Das Kantatenwerk • Complete Cantatas • Les Cantates, Folge / Vol. 7	Nikolaus Harnoncourt: Wiener Sängerknaben; Chorus Viennensis; Concentus Musicus Wien	soloist of the Wiener Sängerknaben; Paul Esswood; Kurt Equiluz; Siegmund Nimsgern	Teldec	1973	Period
Bach Made in Germany Vol. 4 – Cantatas V	Hans-Joachim Rotzsch Thomanerchor Gewandhausorchester	Regina Werner; Rosemarie Lang; Peter Schreier; Hermann Christian Polster	Eterna	1977	
J. S. Bach: Kantaten/Cantatas BWV 80, BWV 26, BWV 116	Karl Richter Münchener Bach-Chor Münchener Bach-Orchester	Edith Mathis; Trudeliese Schmidt; Peter Schreier; Dietrich Fischer-Dieskau	Archiv Produktion	1978	
Die Bach Kantate Vol. 59	Helmuth Rilling Gächinger Kantorei Bach-Collegium Stuttgart	Arleen Auger; Doris Soffel; Adalbert Kraus; Philippe Huttenlocher	Hänssler	1980	
Bach Edition Vol. 11 – Cantatas Vol. 5	Pieter Jan Leusink Holland Boys Choir Netherlands Bach Collegium	Ruth Holton; Sytse Buwalda; Nico van der Meel; Bas Ramselaar	Brilliant Classics	1999	Period
Bach Cantatas Vol. 19: Greenwich/Romsey	John Eliot Gardiner Monteverdi Choir English Baroque Soloists	Joanne Lunn; William Towers; Paul Agnew; Peter Harvey	Soli Deo Gloria	2000	Period
J. S. Bach: Complete Cantatas Vol. 14	Ton Koopman Amsterdam Baroque Orchestra & Choir	Lisa Larsson; Annette Markert; Christoph Prégardien; Klaus Mertens	Antoine Marchand	2000	Period
J. S. Bach: Cantatas Vol. 28 – Cantatas from Leipzig 1724	Masaaki Suzuki Bach Collegium Japan	Yukari Nonoshita; Robin Blaze; Makoto Sakurada; Peter Kooy	BIS	2004	Period

== Sources ==
- Ach wie flüchtig, ach wie nichtig, BWV 26: Scores at the International Music Score Library Project
- Ach wie flüchtig, ach wie nichtig BWV 26; BC A 162 / Chorale cantata (24th Sunday after Trinity) Leipzig University
- BWV 26 Ach wie flüchtig, ach wie nichtig English translation, University of Vermont
- Luke Dahn: BWV 26.6 bach-chorales.com
