= Deutsche Streicherphilharmonie =

German youth orchestra

- Youth orchestra
- Short name: DSP
- Founded: 1973; 52 years ago
- Location: Bonn, Germany
- Website: www.deutsche-streicherphilharmonie.de

The Deutsche Streicherphilharmonie (DSP) (German String Philharmonic) is a German string youth orchestra, based in Bonn.

== History ==
The ensemble was founded in 1973 as the selection string orchestra of the music schools of the German Democratic Republic and from 1976 was called the Rundfunk-Musikschulorchester (RMO). With the support of the Federal Government, it was taken over by the Vienna Philharmonic in 1991 and since then has borne the name "Deutsches Musikschulorchester" (DMO). In 2003, it was renamed the "Deutsche Streicherphilharmonie" (German String Philharmonic).

== Members ==
The German String Philharmonic consists of young people between the ages of 11 and 20 who have qualified for participation in the orchestra through an audition. The ensemble members meet several times a year for rehearsals and concert tours.

Former members now play in renowned orchestras such as the Vienna Philharmonic (concertmaster), the Rundfunk-Sinfonieorchester Berlin, the Sächsische Staatskapelle Dresden and the orchestra of the Metropolitan Opera.

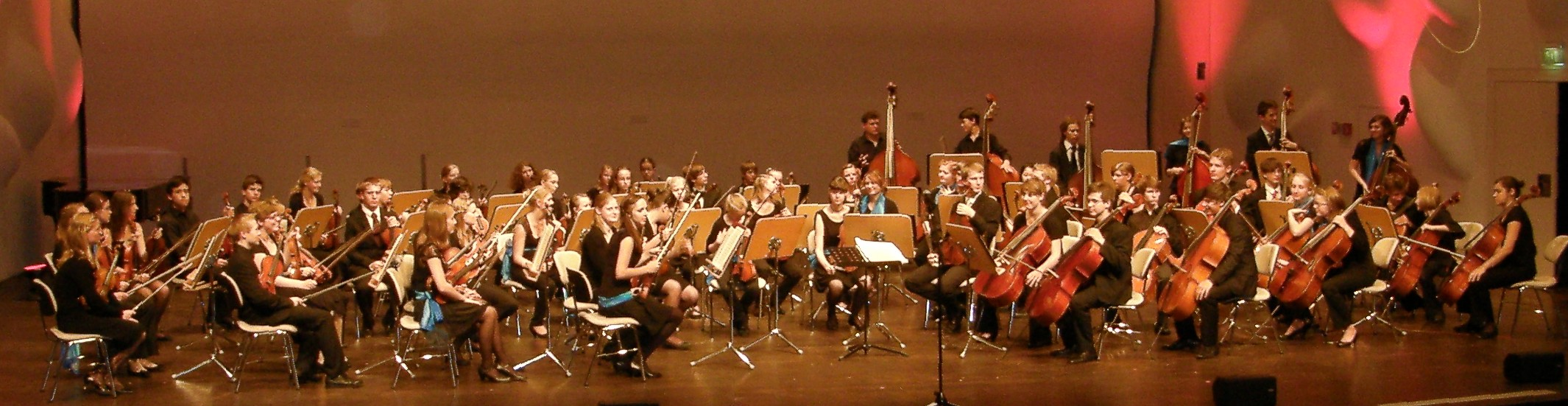
The DSP in the composition of 22 August 2011 at a public concert in Potsdam's Nikolaisaal

== Concerts ==
The orchestra performs at venues including the Konzerthaus Berlin, the Berlin Philharmonie, the Gewandhaus in Leipzig, the Alte Oper Frankfurt, the Kölner Philharmonie and the Saalbau Essen. They regularly tour abroad, in 2013 to Ecuador for their 40th anniversary.

Concert recordings and studio recordings are regularly produced with Deutschlandradio.

== Lecturers ==
The artistic work of the Deutsche Streicherphilharmonie is ensured by a music director, Wolfgang Hentrich since 2013, as well as a permanent Dozententeam consisting of members of the Rundfunk-Sinfonieorchester Berlin, which acts as the DSP's sponsor orchestra. In 2014, the lecturers were Bodo Przesdzing (first violin), Karin Kynast (second violin), Claudia Beyer (viola), Volkmar Weiche (violoncello) and Axel Buschmann (double bass).

== Repertoire ==
The programme includes great works of string orchestra literature from all musical epochs as well as rarities, cabinet pieces and contemporary pieces.

== Music Directors ==
- Helmut Koch 1973–1975
- Herbert Kegel 1974–1976
- Wolf-Dieter Hauschild 1976–1984
- Jörg-Peter Weigle 1984–1995
- Hanns-Martin Schneidt 1995–2002 (Honorary conductor)
- Michael Sanderling 2003–2013 (Honorary conductor)
- Wolfgang Hentrich since 2013.
