= Florian Krumpöck =

Austrian pianist and conductor

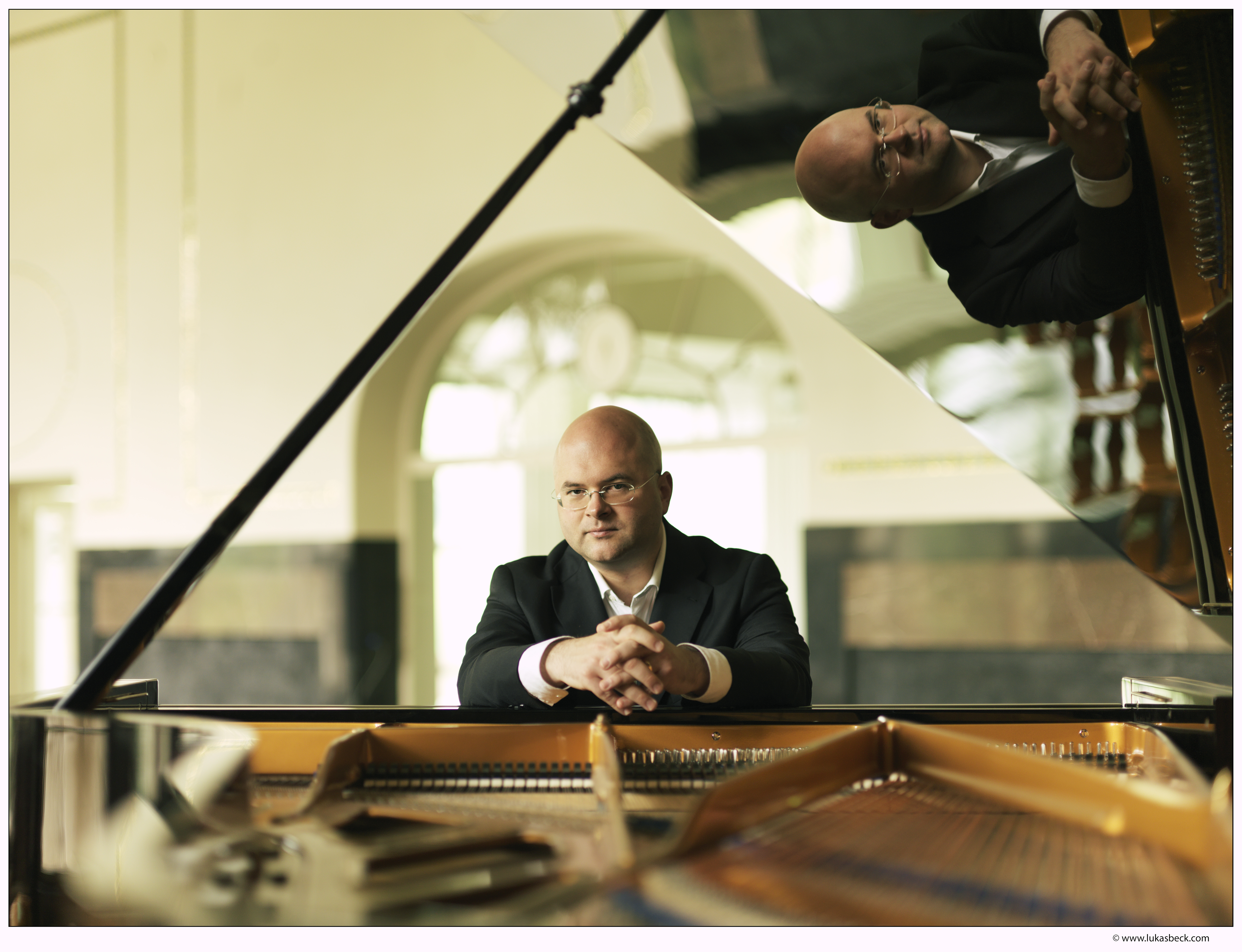
Florian Krumpöck in 2016

Florian Krumpöck (born 1978) is an Austrian pianist and conductor.

== Life ==
Krumpöck is the son of a cellist and an art historian.

== Krumpöck as pianist ==
Among his pianistic teachers were Rudolf Buchbinder, Gerhard Oppitz, Elisabeth Leonskaja and Daniel Barenboim. Krumpöck's pianistic repertoire includes complete cycles of works, such as Johann Sebastian Bach's The Well-Tempered Clavier or the 32 piano sonatas and the five piano concertos by Ludwig van Beethoven, as well as numerous world premieres and first performances, for example of Korngold, Wellesz and Schreker.

Krumpöck has performed among others in Zurich, Vienna, Salzburg, Munich and Moscow as well as in Israel, the USA, China and South Korea and has been a guest at international festivals such as the Salzburg Festival, the Salzburg Easter Festival, the Bregenz Festival, the Bad Kissingen Music Summer, the Bach Festival in Leipzig, the Mecklenburg-Vorpommern Music Festival and the KlangBogen Wien. In 2008, he made his solo debut at the Vienna Musikverein and played 2 complete cycles of Ludwig van Beethoven's 32 piano sonatas for the first time. In 2011, he gave a solo recital in Munich Residenz, which was broadcast by the Bayerischer Rundfunk.

Krumpöck is a Blüthner pianist. His Blüthner concert grand accompanies him on tours and recordings.

== Krumpöck as conductor ==
Daniel Barenboim and Michael Boder are among his mentors.

In 2006, Krumpöck gained international acclaim as a stand-in conductor with the Jerusalem Symphony Orchestra, and in the same year was appointed principal conductor of the Beethoven Philharmonie, a post he held until 2010. In 2007, he conducted for the first time at a New Year's concert at the John F. Kennedy Center for the Performing Arts in Washington, D.C., which led to an engagement at the Gran Teatre del Liceu in Barcelona. In 2010, Krumpöck made his debut in the dual role of pianist and conductor with the Gulbenkian Orchestra in Lisbon and conducted the Theater Trier for the first time. In 2011, he took the podium of the Stadttheater Bremerhaven, the Wonju Philharmonic Orchestra and the Bucheon Philharmonic Orchestra.

From 2011 until 2014, Krumpöck was Generalmusikdirektor (GMD) of the Norddeutsche Philharmonie Rostock and the Volkstheater Rostock. Since 2015, he has been manager of the Festival "Kultur.Sommer.Semmering".

== Discography ==
Six CDs with solo recordings of works by Mozart, Schubert, Liszt and Weber have been released to date.
