= Niklas Willén =

Swedish conductor (born 1961)

Niklas Willén (born 30 March 1961) is a Swedish conductor. He was born in Stockholm and studied conducting and composition there at the Royal College of Music. His conducting teachers were Professors Jorma Panula and Kjell Ingebretsen, while his composition tutors were Ingvar Karkoff and Daniel Börtz.

Niklas Willén has served as Principal Guest Conductor of the Royal Stockholm Philharmonic Orchestra, Chief Conductor of the Nordic Chamber Orchestra in Sweden and the South Jutland Symphony Orchestra in Denmark. He has also been Generalmusikdirektor (GMD) of the Volkstheater Rostock and the Norddeutsche Philharmonie Rostock. He is currently Chief Conductor of the WDR Rundfunkorchester Köln in Cologne. Willén works with major orchestras and opera houses in Scandinavia, the rest of Europe and the USA. He has recorded for a number of labels including Naxos, BIS and Hyperion. He has 4 children, Linnea, Julius, Hugo and Ossian.

Cultural offices
| Preceded by Michail Jurowski | Chief Conductor, Kölner Rundfunkorchester; 2010–2013 | Succeeded by Wayne Marshall |
