= Academy of Berlin =

Academy of Berlin, Berlin Academy, or other variants may refer to:

- Prussian Academy of Arts, founded in 1696 in Berlin, Brandenburg, split in 1955 into East and West Berlin schools
  - Academy of Arts, Berlin, re-formed in 1993 by merging the two academies of East and West Berlin
- Prussian Academy of Sciences, established in Berlin in 1700, fell apart under Nazi rule in 1945
  - German Academy of Sciences at Berlin, reorganised in East Germany in 1946, disbanded in 1991
  - Berlin-Brandenburg Academy of Sciences and Humanities, reconstituted by interstate treaty in 1992
- American Academy in Berlin, a research and cultural institution founded in 1994

== See also ==
- Berlin Singing Academy (disambiguation)
