= Rudolf Neuhaus =

German musician and conductor

Rudolf Neuhaus (3 January 1914 − 7 March 1990) was a German conductor.

== Life ==
Born in Cologne, Neuhaus studied at the Musikhochschule Köln, especially with Hermann Abendroth. From 1934 to 1944 he worked at Landestheater Neustrelitz. In 1937 he joined the Nazi Party.

In 1945 he came to Schwerin and worked there as a conductor until 1953, and from 1950 he succeeded Hans Gahlenbeck as Generalmusikdirektor of the Mecklenburgische Staatskapelle. He became a member of the Christian Democratic Union (East Germany). He also directed the music section of the Mecklenburg State Association in the Cultural Association of the GDR.

In 1953 he was appointed conductor at the Staatsoper in Dresden and lecturer at the Musikhochschule Dresden. Guest conductors have taken him to the Staatsoper Berlin, the Leipzig Gewandhaus orchestra and the Konzerthausorchester Berlin. He was appointed professor in 1959. His students included Hans-Peter Kirchberg and Udo Zimmermann.

He conducted numerous world premieres and first performances. Neuhaus died in Dresden at thee age of 76.

== Awards ==
- 1964: Kunstpreis der DDR
- 1974: Vaterländischer Verdienstorden in Bronze
- 1979: Vaterländischer Verdienstorden in Silber
- 1984: Vaterländischer Verdienstorden in Gold
- 1987: Martin-Andersen-Nexö-Kunstpreis
- 1989: Otto-Nuschke-Plakette.

== Publications ==
- Sekretariat des Hauptvorstandes der CDU, Berlin, ed. (1974). "Unsere Herzen schlagen im gleichen Takt". Auftrag und Verantwortung des Künstlers in der entwickelten sozialistischen Gesellschaft (Bericht über die Tagung des Präsidiums des Hauptvorstandes der CDU mit Künstlern am 23. 11. 1973 in Burgscheidungen). pp. 91–93. OCLC 248065438.
