= Berliner Singakademie =

Berliner Singakademie may refer to:

- Berliner Singakademie (East Berlin), a musical society founded in East Berlin in 1963
- Sing-Akademie zu Berlin, or Berliner Singakademie, a musical society founded in Berlin in 1791
