= Heinz Röttger =

German composer

Heinz Martin Albert Röttger
- Born: 6 November 1909; Herford, German Empire
- Died: 26 August 1977 (aged 67); Dessau, East Germany
- Occupations: composer, musical director

Heinz Martin Albert Röttger (6 November 1909 – 26 August 1977) was a German composer.

From 1928 to 1931, Röttger attended the Akademie der Tonkunst in Munich, where he studied under Walter Courvoisier and Hugo Röhr. From 1930 to 1934, he studied under Alfred Lorenz and Adolf Sandberger at the Ludwig-Maximilians-Universität München; his doctoral thesis was on problems of form in the work of Richard Strauss. Until the outbreak of the Second World War, he was Kapellmeister in Augsburg, in Bavaria.

After the War, he worked at the Stralsunder Theater, in Stralsund in Mecklenburg-Vorpommern; in 1951, he became music director of the Volkstheater Rostock and the municipal orchestra there. In 1954, he was made chief musical director of the Landestheater Dessau, in Dessau in Sachsen-Anhalt, where he remained until his death in Dessau on 26 August 1977.

His works include Bellmann, 1946; Phaeton, 1957; Der Heiratsantrag, a comic opera after Anton Chekhov, 1960; Die Frauen von Troja, 1962; Der Weg nach Palermo, 1965; Spanisches Capriccio, 1976.
