= Homero Francesch =

Concert pianist

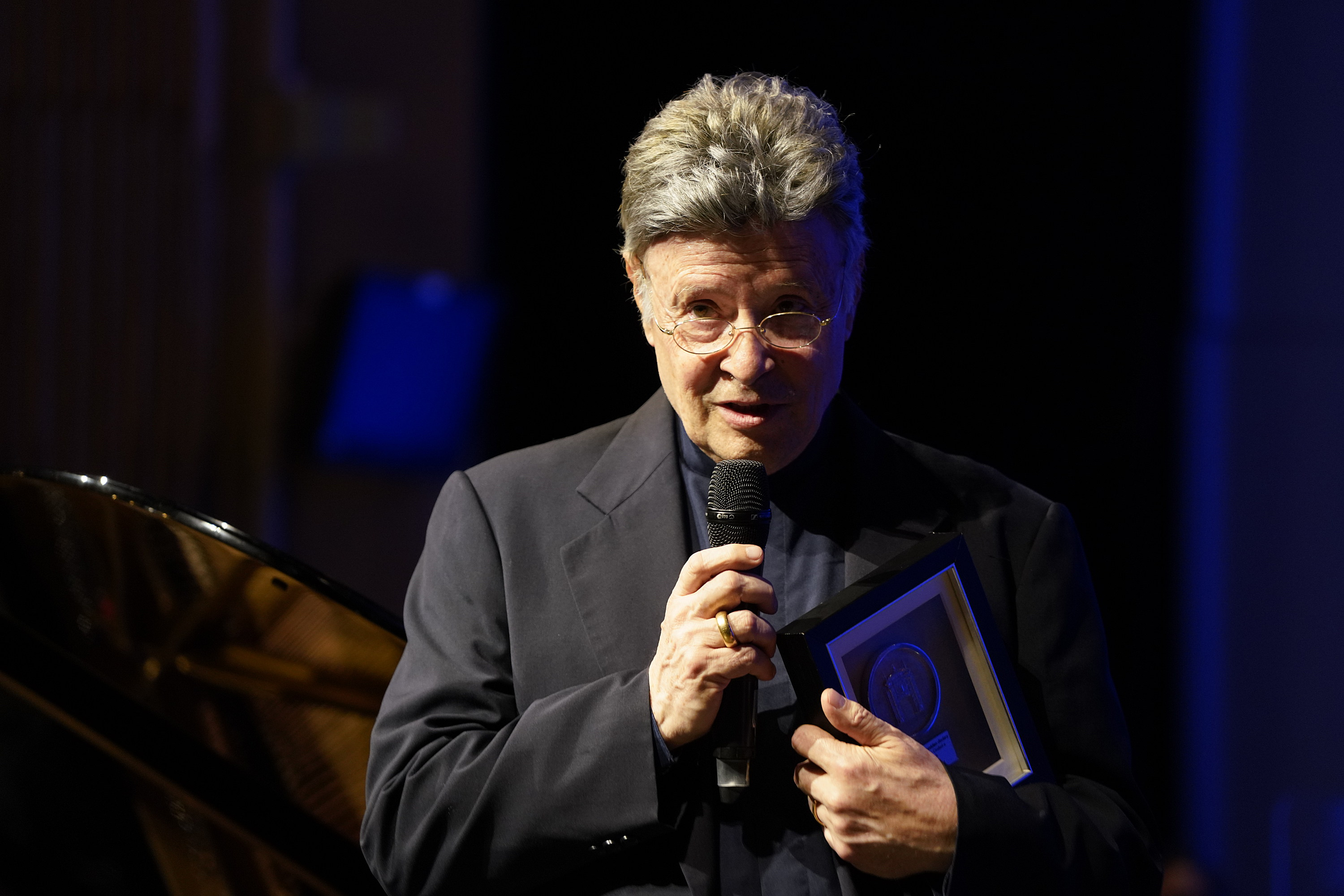
Homero Francesch

Homero Francesch (born 6 December 1947, Montevideo, Uruguay) is a Uruguay-born Swiss pianist.

== Biography ==
Francesch took piano lessons with Santiago Baranda Reyes in Uruguay. In 1967, he was awarded a scholarship by the German Academic Exchange Service (DAAD) and went on to study at the University of Music and Theatre Munich under Hugo Steurer and Ludwig Hoffmann.

He has premiered the works of several contemporary composers, including Hans Werner Henze's Tristan. His recordings include a complete survey of Bartók's Mikrokosmos and Stravinsky's Les Noces under Leonard Bernstein alongside Martha Argerich, Cyprien Katsaris and Krystian Zimerman.
