= Annerose Schmidt =

German pianist (1936–2022)

Annerose Schmidt (5 October 1936 – 10 March 2022) was the professional name used by Annerose Boeck, a German pianist. She received official recognition as a concert pianist from what later became the East German state in 1948, which was the year of her twelfth birthday.

== Life ==
Annerose Boeck was born in Wittenberg, Saxony, Prussia, Germany, a town a short distance to the north of Leipzig, Saxony, which then as now was venerated for its association with Martin Luther. Her father was the director of the music school, and started teaching her the piano in 1941. She gave her first public concert in 1945, and in 1948 received a concert diploma and a professional permit as an officially recognised concert pianist in what was known, at that time, as the Soviet occupation zone. She gave the first of her Berlin Radio concert performances in 1949. After passing her School leaving exam ("Abitur") Annerose Schmidt transferred to the Leipzig Music Academy where she studied between 1953 and 1957, and where she was taught by Hugo Steurer.

In 1955 she received an honorable mention at the V International Chopin Piano Competition in Warsaw. The next year she herself won at the All Germany Piano Competition. Also in 1956 she won the first ever Robert Schumann International Competition for Pianists and Singers, held at Berlin. This proved an effective launch for an international playing career which over the next few years took her on concert tours to Poland, Romania, Hungary, Bulgaria and the Union of Soviet Socialist Republics.

Her repertoire embraced almost eighty piano concertos from the eighteenth and nineteenth centuries, including those by Mozart, Beethoven, Bartók, Chopin and Ravel. She played the entire piano repertoire of Robert Schumann and Brahms, but her range also encompassed some contemporary music.

From 1958 she was able to travel to the west, performing with leading conductors and top orchestras in Finland, Sweden, Great Britain and Northern Ireland, the Netherlands, Belgium, Luxembourg and Austria. She also made guest appearances further afield, in the United States of America, Canada, Japan and Lebanon. Along with her concert appearances, she recorded extensively. A notable project involved recording all of the Mozart Piano concertos with Kurt Masur and the Dresden Philharmonic.

Schmidt was unusual among classical musicians in having made a genuinely quadraphonic recording. This involved Schumann's Kinderszenen (A-side) and the Brahms Piano Sonata Nr. 3 (B-side).

In 1985, she became a professor at the Hanns Eisler Music Academy in East Berlin, East Germany, serving as the (first female) rector of the academy between 1990 and 1995. Annerose Schmidt retired from her performing career on health grounds in 2006.

Schmidt died on 10 March 2022, at the age of 85.

== Awards and honours ==
- 1961 Art Prize of the German Democratic Republic
- 1964 Robert Schumann Prize of the City of Zwickau
- 1965 National Prize of the German Democratic Republic
- 1966 City of Leipzig Arts Prize
- 1971 Patriotic Order of Merit in Bronze
- 1984 National Prize of the German Democratic Republic
- 1985 Béla Bartók Prize
- 2003 Cross of the Order of Merit of the Federal Republic of Germany
