= Olena Tokar =

Ukrainian operatic soprano

- Олена Токар
- Born: Novotoshkivske, Luhansk Oblast, Ukrainian Soviet Socialist Republic
- Occupation: Operatic lyric soprano
- Organizations: Oper Leipzig
- Awards: ARD International Music Competition

Olena Mykolajiwna Tokar (Олена Миколаївна Токар;) is a Ukrainian operatic lyric soprano. She has been a member of the Oper Leipzig since 2010, and has appeared in Europe including at the Verbier Festival as Puccini's Mimì, at the Vilnius Opera as Gounod's Marguerite, as Verdi's La traviata at the Trondheim Opera, and as Gounod's Juliette at the Grange Park Opera. She recorded a collection of art songs by women composers including Clara Schumann and Vítězslava Kaprálová, with pianist Igor Gryshyn.

== Life and career ==
Born in Novotoshkivske, Luhansk Oblast, Tokar studied voice from 2002 to 2006 at the College of Arts and Culture in Luhansk (Ukraine), then at the Kyiv Conservatory in the class of S. P. Busina and E. H. Kolosova. From 2010, she continued her studies at the University of Music and Theatre Leipzig with Regina Werner-Dietrich. In 2011, Tokar took part in the Young Singers Project of the Salzburg Festival, taking master classes with Ileana Cotrubaș, Christa Ludwig, Alfred Brendel and Michael Schade. In 2012, she achieved 1st Prize at the ARD International Music Competition.

Tokar has been a member of the ensemble of the Oper Leipzig, a junior member in the 2009/10 season, and then a full member. She appeared there as Antigona in Handel's Admeto, Pamina in Mozart's Die Zauberflöte, Micaëla in Bizet's Carmen, Mariana in Wagner's Das Liebesverbot and Gretel in Humperdinck's Hänsel und Gretel. In 2016, she added Zdenka in Arabella by Richard Strauss, Liù in Puccini's Turandot and Susanna in Mozart's Le nozze di Figaro to her repertoire. She appeared as Rusalka in Dvorak's Rusalka and as Sophie in Der Rosenkavalier by Richard Strauss.

Tokar has performed as a guest, as Mimì in Puccini's La Bohème at the Verbier Festival in 2015, and as Marguerite in Gounod's Faust at the Semperoper in Dresden in 2016. She first appeared at the Vilnius Opera in 2017 as Marguerite, and performed the title role of Verdi's La traviata at the Trondheim Opera in 2018. She appeared as Juliette in Gounod's Roméo et Juliette at the Grange Park Opera in 2018.

== Recording ==
Tokar's recordings include a collection of art songs by women composers, titled Charmes, with works by Alma Mahler-Werfel, Clara Schumann, Pauline Viardot-Garcia and Vítězslava Kaprálová, accompanied by pianist Igor Gryshyn.

- Östliche Romanze – Liederabend. Live recording from Bundesverwaltungsgericht Leipzig, with Igor Gryshyn, piano. DVD, University of Music and Theatre Leipzig, 2014.
- Richard Strauss: Feuersnot. Münchner Rundfunkorchester, Ulf Schirmer (Olena Tokar as Margret). 2 CDs, Classic Production Osnabrück, 2015.
- Gustav Mahler: Symphony No. 2 "Resurrection". Orchestre National de Lille, Jean-Claude Casadesus Evidence, 2015.
- Charmes, Lieder by Alma Mahler-Werfel, Clara Schumann, Pauline Viardot-Garcia, Vítězslava Kaprálová. With Igor Gryshyn, piano. Orchid, 2020.

== Awards ==
- Grand Prix at the International Boris-Gmyria Competition (2008)
- Finalist in the Ferruccio Tagliavini International Competition for Opera Singers in Deutschlandsberg (2010)
- Finalist at the International singing competition Francisco Viñas in Barcelona (2012)
- 1st Prize at the Lortzing Competition in Leipzig (2012)
- 1st Prize at the ARD International Music Competition (2012)
- Finalist at the BBC Cardiff Singer of the World competition (2013)
- Christine-Kühne Prize of the Festspiele Mecklenburg-Vorpommern (2016)
