= Tristan (Henze) =

Orchestral work by Henze

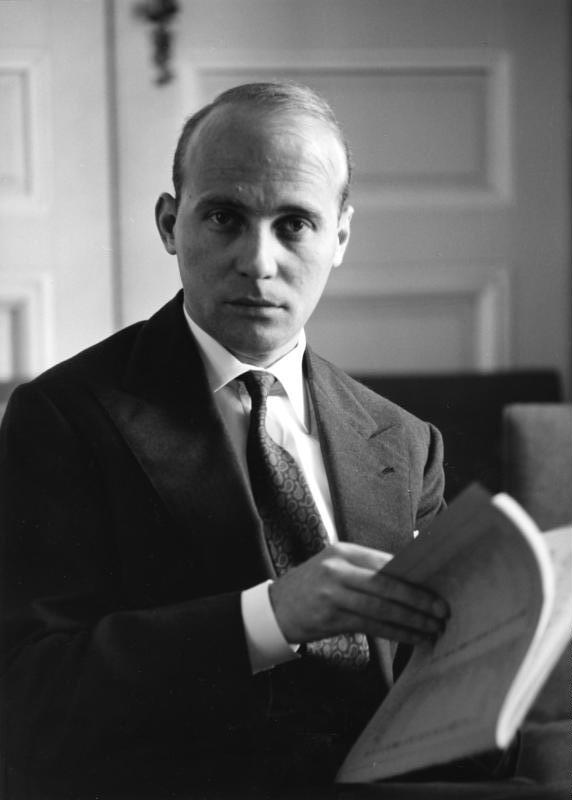
Hans Werner Henze in 1960

Tristan is a six-movement orchestral work by the German composer Hans Werner Henze.

Scored for piano, tape and full orchestra, its form is innovative for an instrumental concert: solo pieces for piano ("preludes") alternate with orchestral passages, which are played partly without, partly with the participation of the piano.

It takes the form of a homage to Richard Wagner's opera Tristan und Isolde, with the piano providing preludes to a series of widely divergent material, both live and on tape, including direct quotations from Brahms's First Symphony and Chopin's Funeral March, a birdsong-like treatment on tape of a recording of a soloist singing Isolde's part and a child reading extracts from Hilaire Belloc's English translation of Joseph Bédier's account of the death of Isolde, as well as a recording of a human heartbeat.

Henze was both attracted to and repelled by aspects of 19th century culture, and so the passages of Wagner, Chopin and Brahms represent musical romanticism, which can be described in terms of progress, virtuosity and historicism.

The tape has its own system in the score, which indicates the actual sound by means of graphic lines. The twelve-tone-set C♯–D–A–D♯–E–H–F–A♯–F♯–G♯–C–G can be traced back to the three-tone constellation of major-third and minor-second, which also determine the first three notes of Richard Wagner's "Tristan and Isolde" (a-f-e).

Commissioned by the London Symphony Orchestra, it was premiered on 20 October 1974 under Colin Davis at the Royal Festival Hall in London. The piano soloist was Homero Francesch, who later recorded it with the composer conducting.

The six movements are:

1. Prologue
2. Lament
3. Prelude and Variations
4. Tristan's Folly
5. Adagio
6. Epilogue
