= Norddeutsche Philharmonie Rostock =

German philharmony orchestra

- Symphony orchestra
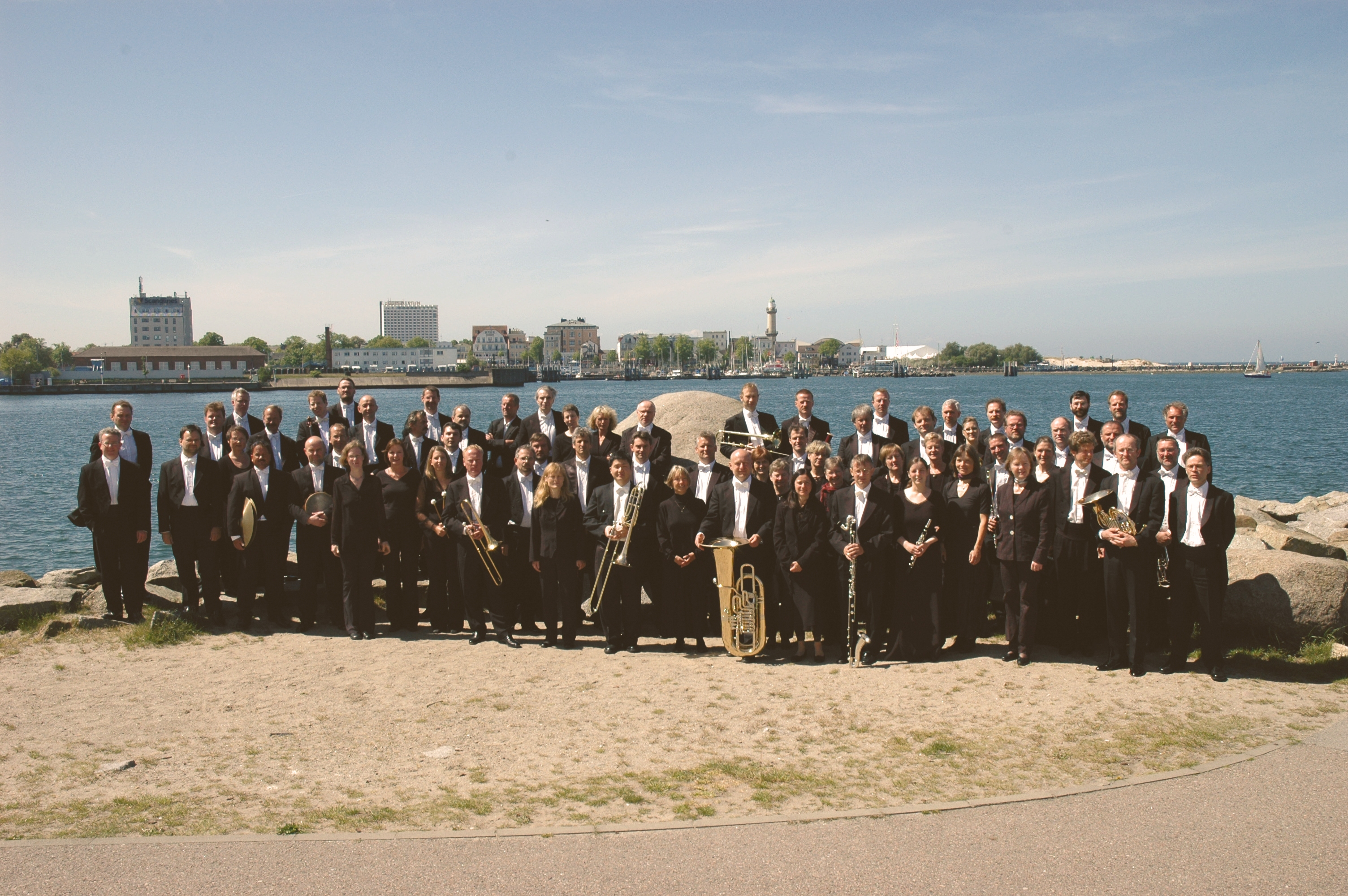
- Norddeutsche Philharmonie Rostock in 2009
- Founded: 1897
- Location: Rostock, Mecklenburg-Vorpommern, Germany
- Principal conductor: Marcus Bosch
- Website: volkstheater-rostock.de/norddeutsche-philharmonie-rostock/

The Norddeutsche Philharmonie Rostock, based in Rostock, Mecklenburg-Vorpommern, Germany, is the state's largest symphony orchestra and also the orchestra of the Volkstheater Rostock. Founded in 1897, the orchestra grew to 90 musicians by 1991. They were rewarded a prize for ambitious programs in 1993.

== History ==
The Norddeutsche Philharmonie Rostock dates back to 1897, when the Leipzig Kapellmeister Heinrich Schulz was commissioned as music director of Rostock to found an orchestra of at least 34 well-trained musicians. On 22 September 1897, the founding concert of this orchestra, named Rostocker Stadt- und Theaterorchester (Rostock municipal and theatre orchestra), took place under his direction in Rostock's then Apollo Hall with Les Préludes by Franz Liszt and Beethoven's Symphony No. 8. In 1914, the orchestra was renamed Städtisches Orchester, now managed by the city of Rostock.

Gerd Puls in particular shaped the development of the orchestra in the post-war period. During his 34 years as Generalmusikdirektor, he led his orchestra to the status of an A orchestra in 1973. In 1990, the orchestra was named Norddeutsche Philharmonie Rostock. His successor Michael Zilm took over in 1991, with an orchestra of 90 musicians. He was able to perform Gustav Mahler's orchestral works including the Second Symphony, and led the orchestra on a tour of Sweden with Mahler's Seventh Symphony in 1995. Other programs of the 1990s focuses on 20th-century music by composers such as Arnold Schoenberg, Paul Hindemith and Alban Berg. In 2000, the Norddeutsche Philharmonie became a member of the European Film Philharmonic, an orchestra association which also includes the WDR Rundfunkorchester Köln, the Staatskapelle Weimar and the Brandenburgisches Staatsorchester Frankfurt (Oder), aimed at promoting the performance and recording of orchestral film music. Within this framework, the orchestra recorded the music by Hans Peter Ströer for Heinrich Breloer's film Buddenbrooks. In 2002, the orchestra made the first recording of Karl Weigl's Piano Concerto for the left hand, with Florian Krumpöck as the soloist and conducted by Manfred Hermann.

Zilm, who became honorary conductor, was succeeded by Mikhail Jurowski in 1997, Wolf-Dieter Hauschild in 2002, Peter Leonard in 2004, Niklas Willén in 2007, and from 2011 the conductor and pianist Krumpöck. The orchestra continued to be threatened by austerity measures by the city of Rostock and the state of Mecklenburg-Vorpommern. Several years followed without a general music director. In 2017, the orchestra received financial support from a national program "Exzellente Orchesterlandschaft Deutschland", for the promotion of contemporary music and educational projects. Marcus Bosch took over as conductor in residence in 2018, and became chief conductor in 2020.

The orchestra was the first symphony orchestra in Germany to resume playing with all members after the restrictions due to the COVID-19 pandemic, playing in September 2020 Bruch's Violin Concerto and Mahler's Fourth Symphony.

== Musical directors ==
The following individuals have held the position of the orchestra's musical director:

- 1897–1924: Heinrich Schulz
- 1928–1931: Hans Schmidt-Isserstedt
- 1931–1938: Adolf Wach
- 1938–1945: Heinz Schubert
- 1948–1949: Gerhard Pflüger
- 1949–1951: Fritz Müller
- 1951–1954: Heinz Röttger
- 1954–1955: Hans Gahlenbeck
- 1955–1957: Gerhart Wiesenhütter
- 1957–1991: Gerd Puls
- 1991–1997: Michael Zilm
- 1997–1999: Michail Jurowski
- 2002–2004: Wolf-Dieter Hauschild (honorary conductor since 2004)
- 2004–2007: Peter Leonard
- 2009–2011: Niklas Willén
- 2011–2014: Florian Krumpöck
- 2020–present: Marcus Bosch (principal conductor, from 2018 conductor in residence)

== Awards ==
In 1993, the orchestra was awarded the prize of the German Music Publishers Association for its ambitious programming with GMD Michael Zilm. In 1998, on the occasion of its 100th anniversary, the Norddeutsche Philharmonie Rostock received the Kulturpreis der Hansestadt Rostock.
