= Gerhard Pflüger =

Gerhard Friedrich Wilhelm Pflüger (9 April 1907 − 24 October 1991) was a German conductor.

== Life ==
Born in Dresden, Pflüger attended the citizen school and a grammar school in Dresden from 1913 to 1924. He then studied with Kurt Striegler and Fritz Busch at the orchestra school of the Staatskapelle Dresden until 1927. From 1927 to 1930 he was solo répétiteur, kapellmeister and choir conductor in Tilsit in East Prussia. From 1930 to 1932 he was first Kapellmeister in Stralsund and until 1935 in Gotha. From 1935 to 1938 he worked as musical director in Nordhausen. Until 1940 he was first Kapellmeister in Altenburg and afterwards in Meiningen. In 1940 he joined the Nazi Party.

From 1946 he was a member of the Sozialistische Einheitspartei Deutschlands. From 1948 to 1955 he was general music director and artistic director of the Volkstheater Rostock and the municipal orchestra. He also directed the conducting class at the Hochschule für Musik und Theater Rostock. From 1949 to 1957 he was permanent conductor of the MDR Sinfonieorchester and from 1957 to 1973 of the Deutsches Nationaltheater und Staatskapelle Weimar. In addition, since 1962 he was professor and head of the conducting class at the Hochschule für Musik Franz Liszt, Weimar.

In 1972 Pflüger was awarded the Art Prize of the German Democratic Republic.

Pflüger died in Weimar in 1991 at the age of 84.

== Literature ==
- Gitta Günther, Wolfram Huschke, Walter Steiner (ed.): Weimar. Lexikon zur Stadtgeschichte. 2nd edition, Böhlau, Weimar 1993, ISBN 3-7400-0807-5, p. 351.
- Fred K. Prieberg: Handbuch Deutsche Musiker 1933–1945. CD-ROM-Lexikon, Kiel 2004, p. 5244.
- Bernd Meyer-Rähnitz, Frank Oehme, Joachim Schütte (ed.): Die Ewige Freundin. - Von Lied der Zeit zum VEB Deutsche Schallplatten Berlin. Eine Firmendiscographie der Schellackplatten von AMIGA, ETERNA und LIED DER ZEIT, sowie REGINA und RADIOPHON. albis-international, Dresden-Ústí 2006, ISBN 80-86971-10-4.
