= Hendrik Vestmann =

Estonian conductor

Hendrik Vestmann (born 30 April 1974) is an Estonian conductor.

== Life ==
Born in Tartu, Vestmann studied choral direction from 1992 to 1996 at the Estonian Academy of Music and Theatre in Tallinn. He was subsequently employed as a conductor at the Vanemuine theatre and opera house in Tartu, southern Estonia. In 1997, he founded and conducted the orchestra of the Tallinn district of Nõmme (Estonian Nõmme Linnaorkester).

At the turn of the millennium, Vestmann went to Germany. From 2000 to 2002, he studied with Wolf-Dieter Hauschild at the Hochschule für Musik Karlsruhe. From 2002 to 2004, Vestmann was Solo répétiteur and conductor at the Theater & Orchester Heidelberg.

In 2004/2005, Vestmann was General Music Director at the Vanemuine Theatre and Opera House in Tartu. Since September 2006, Vestmann has been first Kapellmeister and deputy general music director at the Städtische Bühnen Münster.

Since the 2013/2014 season, Vestmann has been chief conductor of the Bonn Opera. Since the 2016/2017 season, he has served as general music director of the Staatstheater in Oldenburg.

== Awards ==
Im May 2006 Vestmann won the Hermann Abendroth Prize in Weimar. In the same year, he was awarded the special prize of the Dirigentenforum.
