= Novotoshkivske =

Urban locality in Luhansk Oblast, Ukraine

Novotoshkivske Новотошківське
- Rural settlement
- Interactive map of Novotoshkivske
- Location of Novotoshkivske within Ukraine Novotoshkivske (Ukraine)
- Coordinates: 48.725278°N 38.6325°E
- Country: Ukraine
- Oblast: Luhansk Oblast
- Raion: Sievierodonetsk Raion
- Status: 1972
- Elevation: 86 m (282 ft)

Population (2022)
  - Total: 2,119
- Time zone: UTC+2 (EET)
  - Summer (DST): UTC+3 (EEST)
- Postal code: 93891
- Area code: +380 6446

Novotoshkivske (Ukrainian: Новотошківське; Russian: Новотошковское) is a rural settlement in Sievierodonetsk Raion (district) in Luhansk Oblast of eastern Ukraine, at 52 km WNW from the centre of Luhansk city. Population: 2,119 (2022 estimate).

People from the town include Olena Tokar who made a career in Europe as a lyric soprano.

The War in Donbas, that started in mid-April 2014, has brought along both civilian and military casualties. One Ukrainian soldier was killed in a skirmish near the settlement in the course of an infiltration attempt through the demarcation line by pro-Russian forces supported by 120 mm mortar fire on 1 December 2016. One Ukrainian serviceman was killed by shelling on 26 January 2017. One Ukrainian soldier was killed in a direct clash with separatist troops on 15 July 2017.

During the 2022 Russian invasion of Ukraine, Russia launched heavy air strikes against Novotoshkivske. Almost all buildings were destroyed. On 26 April 2022 Ukrainian officials reported that Russian forces had captured the settlement.
