= Hans Gahlenbeck =

German conductor

Hans Gahlenbeck (27 September 1896 − 10 December 1975) was a German conductor and Generalmusikdirektor (GMD).

== Life ==
Born in Rostock, from 1926 to 1928 Gahlenbeck was artistic director of the Orchestervereinigung Berliner Musikfreunde. In 1928, as conductor, he became the musical director of the Theater Kiel. After the departure of Fritz Stein as conductor of the Verein der Musikfreunde (Musikfreunde Kiel / VdM) and Kiel University Music Director, Gahlenbeck became his successor as director of the VdM concerts and municipal music director in 1933 and as general music director in 1934, which made it possible to abolish the separation of opera and concert activities. As expected, the concert programmes were "German" during the Nazi era: A lot of Beethoven and Mozart, Schubert, Brahms, Strauss and Pfitzner. In 1937 he became a member of the NSDAP. In 1938 he was appointed as GMD at the Mecklenburgisches Staatstheater Schwerin. In 1939 he received the honorary title Staatskapellmeister. He was active for the Gau Mecklenburg of the party, since about 1941 also as Gaubeauftragter für Musikangelegenheiten.

After 1945 he continued to work as conductor or GMD in Mecklenburg in Schwerin and in 1954/55 as GMD in Rostock at the Norddeutsche Philharmonie Rostock. In 1955 Gahlenbeck followed a call as GMD to the Landestheater Eisenach; his successor was Gerhart Wiesenhütter. A performance of Wagner's Der Ring des Nibelungen prepared by Heinz Röttger in 1954 was the first cyclical performance of this kind in the GDR and he then became the new musical director. He was musical director until 1967.

Gahlenbeck died in Eisenach at the age of 89.

Honours

- Honorary member of the theatre ensemble at Thüringen Landestheater Eisenach
- 1966 Vaterländischer Verdienstorden in Bronze.

== Literature ==
- Michael Buddrus: Mecklenburg im Zweiten Weltkrieg. Edition Temmen, Bremen 2009, ISBN 978-3-8378-4000-1.
- Ernst Klee: Das Kulturlexikon zum Dritten Reich. Wer war was vor und nach 1945. S. Fischer, Frankfurt am Main 2007, ISBN 978-3-10-039326-5.
- Hans Gahlenbeck (1896-1975) : Porträt.
