= Michael Franck =

German composer and poet

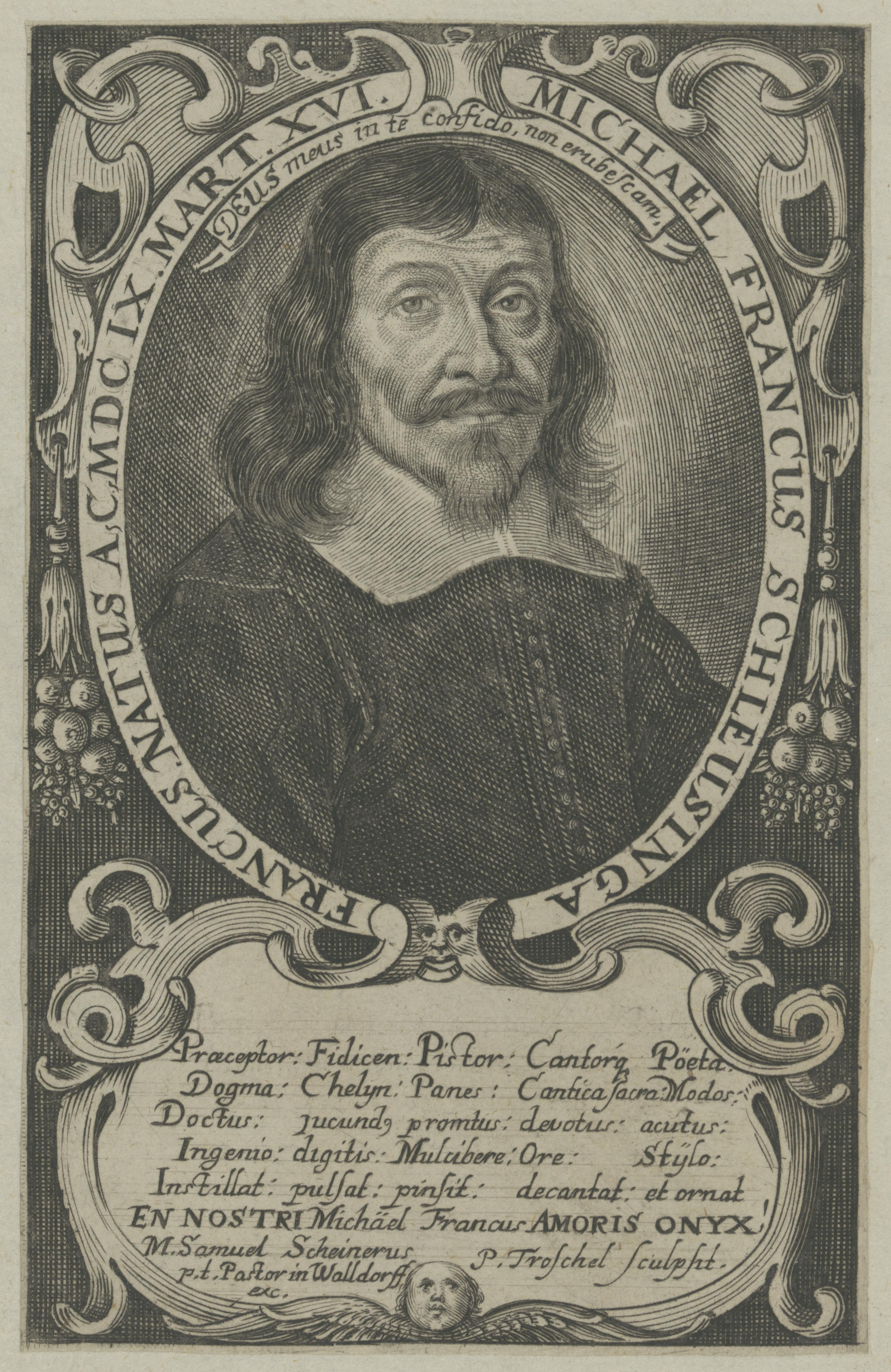
Engraving of Franck c. 1660, with punning caption in Latin "Michael Francus, born a freeman (francus) of Schleusingen in the year 1609 on March 16"

Michael Franck (16 March 1609 – 24 September 1667) was a German poet, composer and Protestant hymnwriter. He was born in Schleusingen, and died in Coburg.

Franck initially established a career as a baker. Although he was fairly successful, "he became completely impoverished, because of nocturnal thefts and plunders of his house". He moved to Coburg in 1640, and began teaching. There, he also wrote hymns and poems. Johann Rist thought highly of Franck's poetry, and, in 1659, inducted Franck into his literary association, Elbschwanenorden (Order of Elbe Swans).

== Hymns ==
Franck's hymns have been incorporated into compositions by Johann Sebastian Bach and Georg Philipp Telemann.

Franck's hymn "Ach wie flüchtig, ach wie nichtig" was the base for Bach's chorale cantata Ach wie flüchtig, ach wie nichtig, BWV 26.
