= Ach wie flüchtig, ach wie nichtig =

German Lutheran hymn from 1652

- German Lutheran hymn
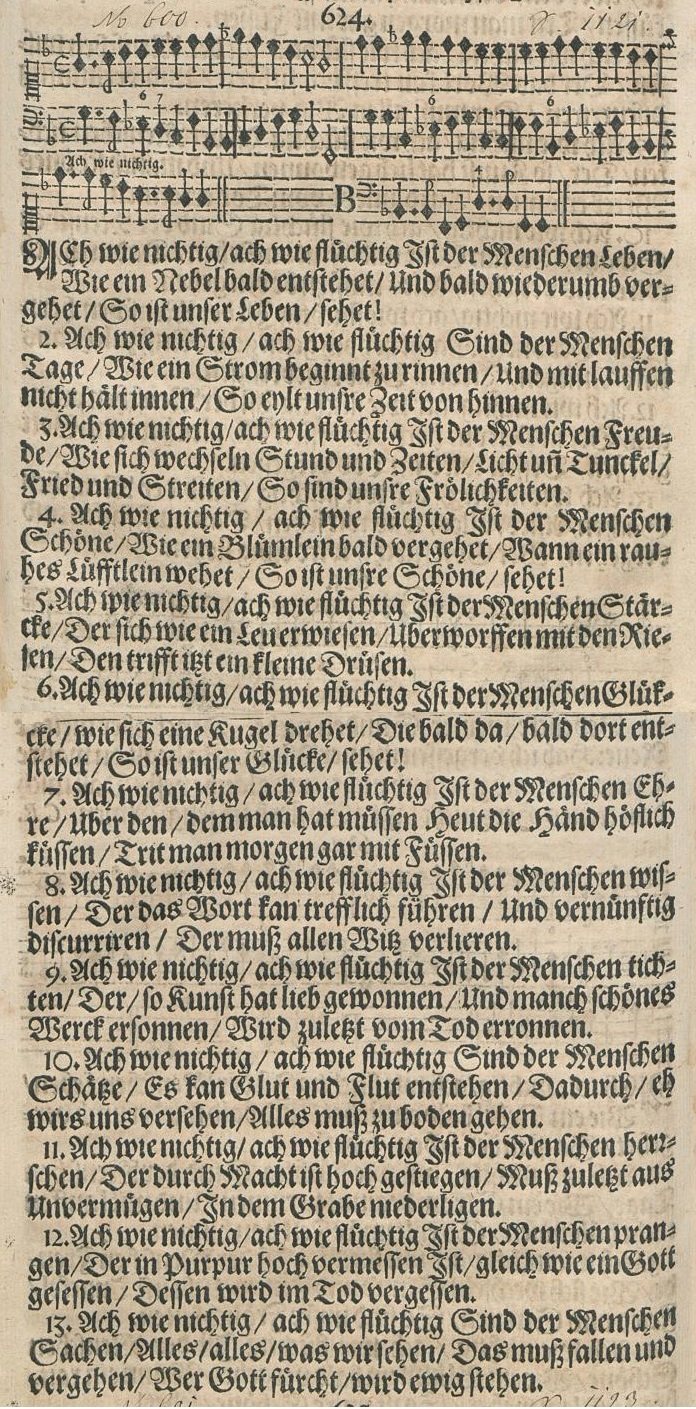
- The hymn in the 1666 edition of Praxis pietatis melica
- English: Ah how fleeting, ah how insubstantial
- Catalogue: Zahn 1887–1889
- Written: 1652
- Text: by Michael Franck
- Language: German
- Melody: by Johann Crüger
- Published: 1661

"Ach wie flüchtig, ach wie nichtig" (Ah how fleeting, ah how insubstantial) is a German Lutheran hymn with lyrics by Michael Franck, who published it with his own melody and a four-part setting in 1652. Johann Crüger's reworked version of the hymn tune was published in 1661. Several Baroque composers used the hymn, including Johann Sebastian Bach, who wrote a chorale cantata. It is part of the current Protestant hymnal Evangelisches Gesangbuch, and has also been used by 20th-century composers such as Ernst Pepping and Mauricio Kagel.

== History ==
The lyrics of the hymn were written by Michael Franck after the Thirty Years' War. Franck, who initially worked as a baker, before turning to teaching, poetry, and music, based it on the biblical "Vanity of vanities, saith the Preacher, vanity of vanities; all is vanity." (Ecclesiastes 1:2). His models were vanity poems by Andreas Gryphius, namely "Die Herrlichkeit der Erden / Muß Rauch und Aschen werden" ("The Splendour of the Earth / Will end in smoke and ashes"). He published it in Coburg in 1652, with his melody and a four-part setting. The title referred to "Vanity, Falsehood and Transitoriness of the World" ("Die Eitelkeit / Falschheit und Unbeständigkeit der WELT und Flüchtigkeit der Irrdischen Gütter / Hergegen Das rechte standhaffte GUT der Himmlischen Gemüther"). The hymn was the topic of sermons (Liedpredigten).

The hymn originally consisted of 13 stanzas of five lines each. All odd stanzas begin with Ach wie flüchtig, ach wie nichtig ("Oh how fleeting, oh how vain"), and all even stanzas begin Ach wie nichtig, ach wie flüchtig ("Oh how vain, oh how fleeting"). The second line specifies what is fleeting, which is expanded by lines three to five, all of which rhyme. Eight of the stanzas are included in the current Protestant hymnal Evangelisches Gesangbuch as EG 528.

== Melodies and settings ==
Franck's original hymn tune, Zahn No. 1887a, was published together with the hymn text in 1652. According to Franck's preface of that publication, the hymn, text as well as melody, had already been printed before. Johann Crüger published his reworked version of the melody, Zahn No. 1887b, in the 1661 edition of his hymnal Praxis pietatis melica. Other tunes for the hymn were composed by Andreas Hammerschmidt (Zahn No. 1888, published 1658) and Peter Sohren (Zahn No. 1889, published 1668).

Georg Philipp Telemann included settings of the hymn in his cantatas TWV 1:37, 1:38, 4:2 and 4:6. Bach, who used Crüger's variant of the tune in his compositions, based his chorale cantata Ach wie flüchtig, ach wie nichtig, BWV 26, for the 24th Sunday after Trinity in 1724, on the hymn. Bach also composed the chorale prelude "Ach wie flüchtig, ach wie nichtig", BWV 644 as No. 46 of his Orgelbüchlein. Johann Gottlieb Naumann used the final stanza for his Zeit und Ewigkeit (Time and Eternity). Several motets and organ settings by Baroque composers are extant. Ernst Pepping used the hymn as the basis for his Partita for organ, No. 1, in 1953. Mauricio Kagel quoted the hymn in his oratorio Sankt-Bach-Passion telling Bach's life, composed for the tricentenary of Bach's birth in 1985.
