= Hugo Steurer =

German pianist and teacher

Hugo Steurer (1914–2004) was a German pianist and teacher.

Steurer made his debut in 1934. He was considered one of Germany's leading interpreters of Ludwig van Beethoven's piano music.

In 1953–58 Hugo Steurer taught at the University of Music and Theatre Leipzig. Later, he taught at the University of Music and Performing Arts Munich. Among his pupils were or are Homero Francesch, Gerhard Oppitz, Yaara Tal, Heinz Rögner, Michael Endres, and Annerose Schmidt.
