= Heidi Rieß =

German contralto (1943–2022)

Heidi Rieß (also Heidi Rieß-Berthold, Heidi Riess-Berthold and Heidi Berthold-Rieß, Heidi Berthold-Riess, 12 May 1943 – 27 May 2022) was a German contralto and music educator.

== Life ==
Rieß was born in 1943 in Chemnitz as the daughter of Irma and Heinz Rieß. She first learned the profession of stenographer. From 1960 to 1962 she was involved in the movement Young Talents in the GDR, which aimed to promote artistically talented children and young people by providing them with public performance opportunities. There Rieß took on leading roles. These opened up the opportunity for her to study at the University of Music and Theatre Leipzig with Eva Fleischer. In 1968, she successfully completed these studies. Rieß had twice received a Mendelssohn Scholarship.

=== Teaching activity ===
After graduating, Rieß herself taught at the Hochschule in Leipzig, first as an assistant and later as senior assistant. In 1992 she was appointed professor of singing. After 35 years of teaching, by 2003 she had trained over one hundred professional singers.

=== Career ===
In addition to teaching at the university level, Rieß has also pursued her own artistic career as a concert singer. Her first highlight was winning First Prize at the Johann Sebastian Bach International Competition in 1968, and she achieved a Second Prize at the Geneva International Music Competition in 1968. A First Prize was not awarded here. She achieved further first prizes at the Sofia Singing Competition and at the Robert Schumann International Competition for Pianists and Singers in Zwickau in 1969.

In the following decades, Rieß had built up an extensive and varied concert career. She performed with famous orchestras and choirs such as the Gewandhausorchester Leipzig, the MDR Leipzig Radio Symphony Orchestra, the Radio-Symphonie-Orchester Berlin, the Dresdner Philharmonie, the Thomanerchor Leipzig and the Dresdner Kreuzchor. She has given guest performances in many countries of the world, including Italy, Belgium, Switzerland, Hungary and Japan. She has performed at numerous festivals such as the Bachfest Leipzig and the International Bachfest Schaffhausen, the Flanders Festival and the Handel Festival in Halle. She has worked with conductors such as Kurt Masur, Hans-Joachim Rotzsch, Herbert Blomstedt, Helmut Koch, Heinz Rögner, Herbert Kegel, Charles de Wolff. Heidi Rieß was heard in numerous opera and song recitals on radio and television. She recorded for the label Eterna numerous sound carriers.

=== Retirement ===
As of 2020 Rieß lived in a senior citizens' complex in Leipzig and campaigned for dignified ageing. She gave concerts there on her piano, often with music students from the Leipzig University of Applied Sciences, for her fellow residents. "With every stroke on the keys, memories from the past come flooding back – of her time as a singer, concerts with Peter Schreier, performances with the Dresdner Kreuzchor or the Leipziger Gewandhausorchester. " Or in her own words: "I used to go on concert tours in Japan, today I'm happy about every trip with my electric chair."
