= Berliner Singakademie (East Berlin) =

Amateur choir in Berlin

- Choir
- Origin: East Berlin, Germany
- Founded: 1963
- Founder: Helmut Koch
- Genre: Renaissance, Baroque, Classical, Romantic, Modern and Contemporary
- Members: 90
- Music director: Achim Zimmermann

Berliner Singakademie, consisting of nearly 90 singers, is one of the largest amateur choirs in Berlin. It sees itself in the tradition of Sing-Akademie zu Berlin, founded in 1791 and still existing. The choir sings Renaissance, Baroque, Classical, Romantic, Modern and Contemporary music. The choir was founded in 1963 by Helmut Koch. Since 1989, Achim Zimmermann is its director.
