= Heinz Rögner =

German conductor

Heinz Rögner (16 January 1929 – 10 December 2001) was a German conductor. He was born in Leipzig.

Rögner was a student of Hugo Steurer (piano), Egon Bölsche (conducting) and Otto Gutschlicht (viola). From 1947 to 1951, he was a repetiteur and kapellmeister at the conductor at the Deutsches Nationaltheater and Staatskapelle Weimar. In 1954, he became a lecturer in conducting and opera at the Hochschule für Musik und Theater Felix Mendelssohn Bartholdy in Leipzig. He was also a professor at the Hochschule für Musik Hanns Eisler.

From 1958 to 1962, Rögner was chief conductor of the Leipzig Radio Orchestra. From 1973 to 1993, he was chief conductor of the Berlin Radio Symphony Orchestra. In 1984, he became chief conductor of the Yomiuri Nippon Symphony Orchestra, and in 1990 took the title of permanent guest conductor.
