= Helmut Koch (conductor) =

German conductor and choir leader (1908–1975)

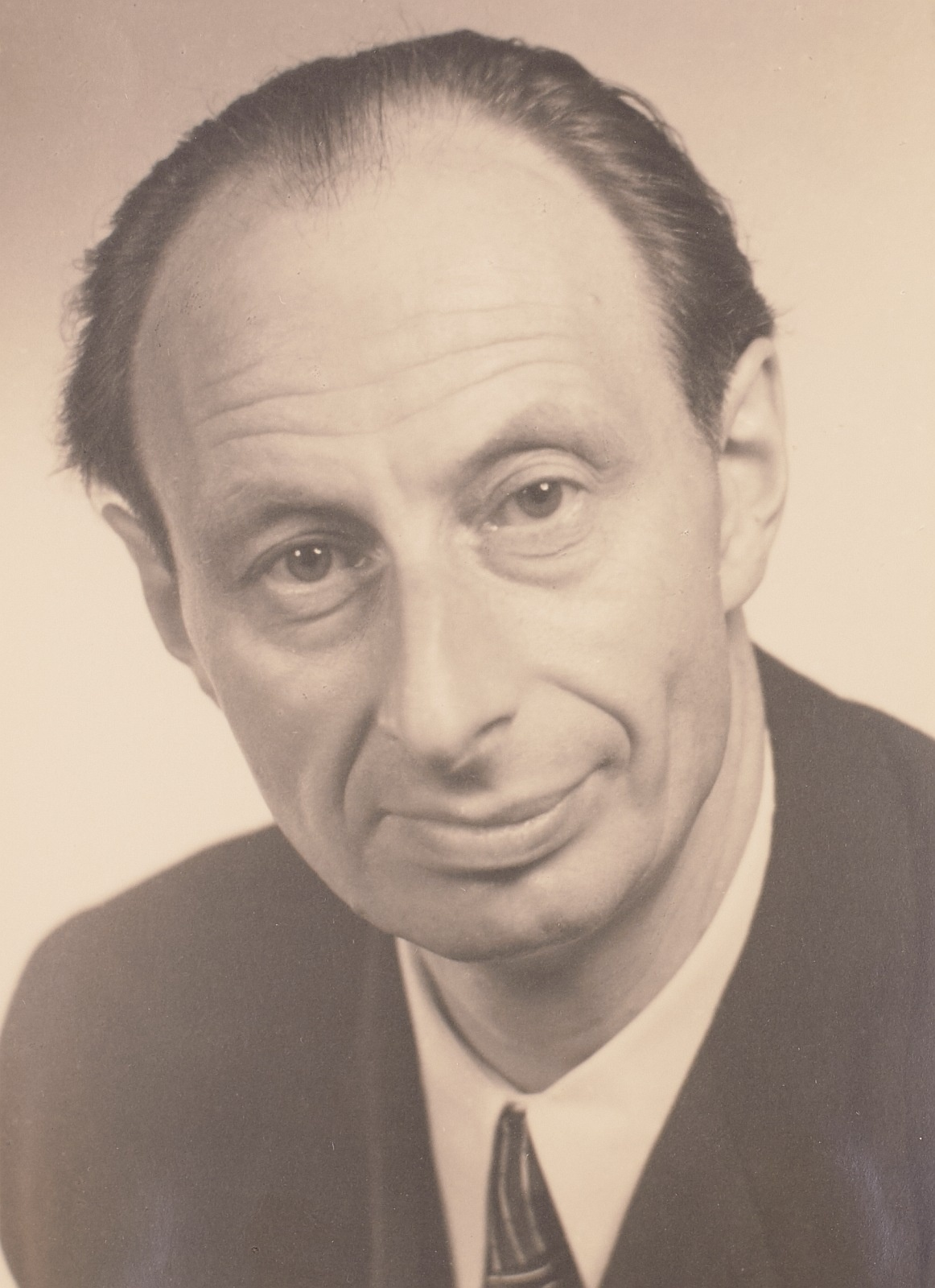
- Koch in 1955
- Born: 5 April 1908; Barmen, Germany
- Died: 26 January 1975 (aged 66); East Berlin, East Germany
- Education: Rheinische Musikschule; Folkwang Hochschule
- Occupations: Conductor; Composer; Academic teacher
- Organizations: Berliner Rundfunk; Hochschule für Musik "Hanns Eisler"; Staatsoper Berlin; Berliner Singakademie
- Awards: National Prize of the GDR; Handel Prize; Vaterländischer Verdienstorden

Helmut Koch (5 April 1908 – 26 January 1975) was a German conductor, choir leader, composer, and academic teacher. He was recording manager for the Berliner Rundfunk from 1945, where he founded the Solistenvereinigung Berlin, the Kammerorchester Berlin and the Großer Chor des Berliner Rundfunks. He conducted a recording of Monteverdi's L'Orfeo in 1949, and later also contemporary classical music by composers including Hanns Eisler, Fritz Geißler, Ernst Hermann Meyer and Ruth Zechlin. He was professor at the Hochschule für Musik "Hanns Eisler" from its beginning. After working as a regular guest conductor at the Staatsoper Berlin, he became Generalmusikdirektor. He was the first conductor of the Berliner Singakademie in East Berlin, and held the position until his death.

== Life and career ==
Koch was born in Barmen, now part of Wuppertal, North Rhine-Westphalia. As buying a piano was unaffordable for his parents, Koch learned to play the violin from the age of twelve. When he was age 16 the family moved to Essen. The violin lessons were continued, and Koch also took lessons in music theory and composition after leaving the Realgymnasium. He studied at the Rheinische Musikschule in Cologne and stayed there until the founding of the Folkwang Hochschule in Essen. Although he had plans for a career as a conductor, he fulfilled his parents' wish to focus on pedagogy, and took a private music teacher's examination in 1928.

In 1928, Koch met Hermann Scherchen as a participant in a conducting course. The latter suggested that he participate in a four-week music festival in Winterthur (Switzerland) as a violinist and viola player in order to broaden his knowledge of orchestral playing. During this time, Scherchen decided to train Koch as a private student and also helped him to find work as a sound engineer and assistant with conducting duties at the then Ostmarken Rundfunk AG in Königsberg. In 1931, he moved to Berlin where he took over the direction of workers' choirs, including the Berliner Schubertchor.

In 1938, Koch became recording manager (Aufnahmeleiter) for the record company Schallplatten AG Carl Lindström. He was a member of the Nazi party. He was drafted to the Volkssturm in February 1945.

Immediately after the war, Koch became recording manager for the Berliner Rundfunk, where he founded the Solistenvereinigung des Berliner Rundfunks and the Kammerorchester Berlin. He founded the Großer Chor des Berliner Rundfunks in 1948. Koch was a candidate for the Sozialistische Einheitspartei Deutschlands (SED) in 1950, and a member from 1954. In the 1950s, he was appointed professor of conducting at the new Hochschule für Musik "Hanns Eisler". Koch was a regular guest conductor at the Staatsoper Berlin from 1960 where he led Handel's Giulio Cesare and Ezio, among others. He was instrumental in a revival of Handel's oratorios which he also conducted at the Halle Handel Festival. Koch was appointed Generalmusikdirektor (GMD) in 1963.

Koch, committed to the close cooperation of professional and amateur artists, became the first conductor of the Berliner Singakademie in 1963 after the Berlin Wall was built, founded then to continue the tradition of the Sing-Akademie zu Berlin also in the East. He held the position until his death.

Koch died in Berlin aged 66.

== Recordings ==
Koch's recordings of Monteverdi's L'Orfeo in 1949, with the Solistenvereinigung and the Kammerochester, and of Folk songs and madrigals of the 17th and 18th centuries were awarded the Grand Prix du Disque. He conducted Ein deutsches Requiem by Brahms in the 1950s, with soloists Anna Tomowa-Sintow and Günther Leib. Beginning in the 1960s, he recorded Mozart works, including the Great Mass in C minor and the operas Bastien und Bastienne and Der Schauspieldirektor. He recorded Haydn's Die Schöpfung, concertos by Telemann and Vivaldi, and Bach's Brandenburg Concertos. His repertoire also included works by Mendelssohn and contemporary classical music. In particular, he promoted the works Hanns Eisler, Fritz Geißler, Ernst Hermann Meyer, and Ruth Zechlin.

For VEB Deutsche Schallplatten: Eterna

- Monteverdi, L'Orfeo (1949)
- Haydn, Die Jahreszeiten (1966)
- Haydn, Nelsonmesse (1971)
- Handel, Judas Maccabaeus (1966)
- Meyer, Mansfelder Oratorium (1969)
- Telemann, Pimpinone (1964)
- Telemann, Die Tageszeiten (1969)
- Zechlin, Wenn der Wacholder blüht (1969)
- Beethoven, Christus am Ölberge, Op. 85 (1970)
- Bach, Brandenburg Concertos (1972 and 1974)
- Handel, Der Messias (1973)
- Mozart, Bastien und Bastienne (1965)

== Awards ==
Koch was twice awarded the National Prize of the GDR for art and literature, in 1949 third class, and in 1959 second class. In 1959, he was awarded the Handel Prize. In 1965, he was elected a full member of the Academy of Arts of the German Democratic Republic. In 1968, he was awarded the Vaterländischer Verdienstorden in silver and 1973 in gold.

== View of music ==
For Koch, music old and new was a medium able to transform people; therefore composers and performers should handle it responsibly. He rejected a division of old and new music, saying: "Everything we do, we do for the people who live now, and who think and feel as today's. ("Alles, was wir machen, machen wir für die Menschen, die jetzt leben, als Heutige denken und empfinden.")
