= Volkstheater Rostock =

Coordinates: 54.0908°N 12.1174°E

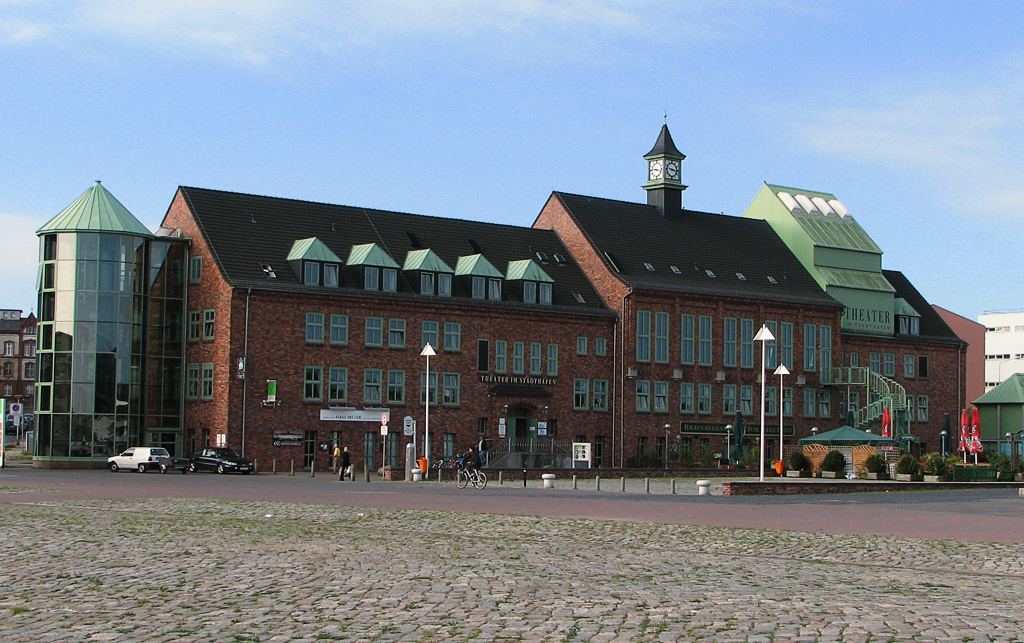
The Theater im Stadthafen – one of the 3 venues

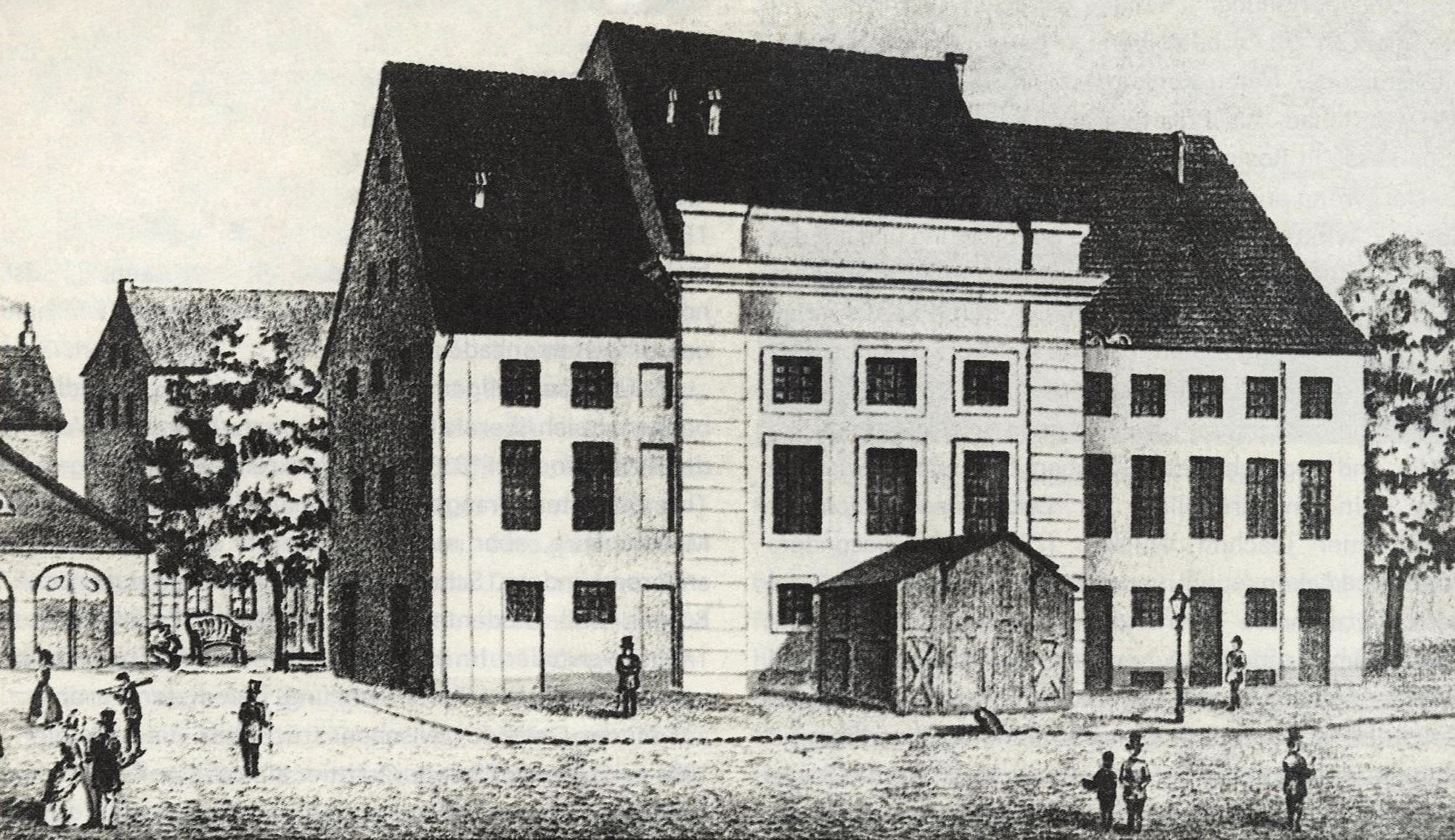
Stadttheater Rostock of 1786 to 1880

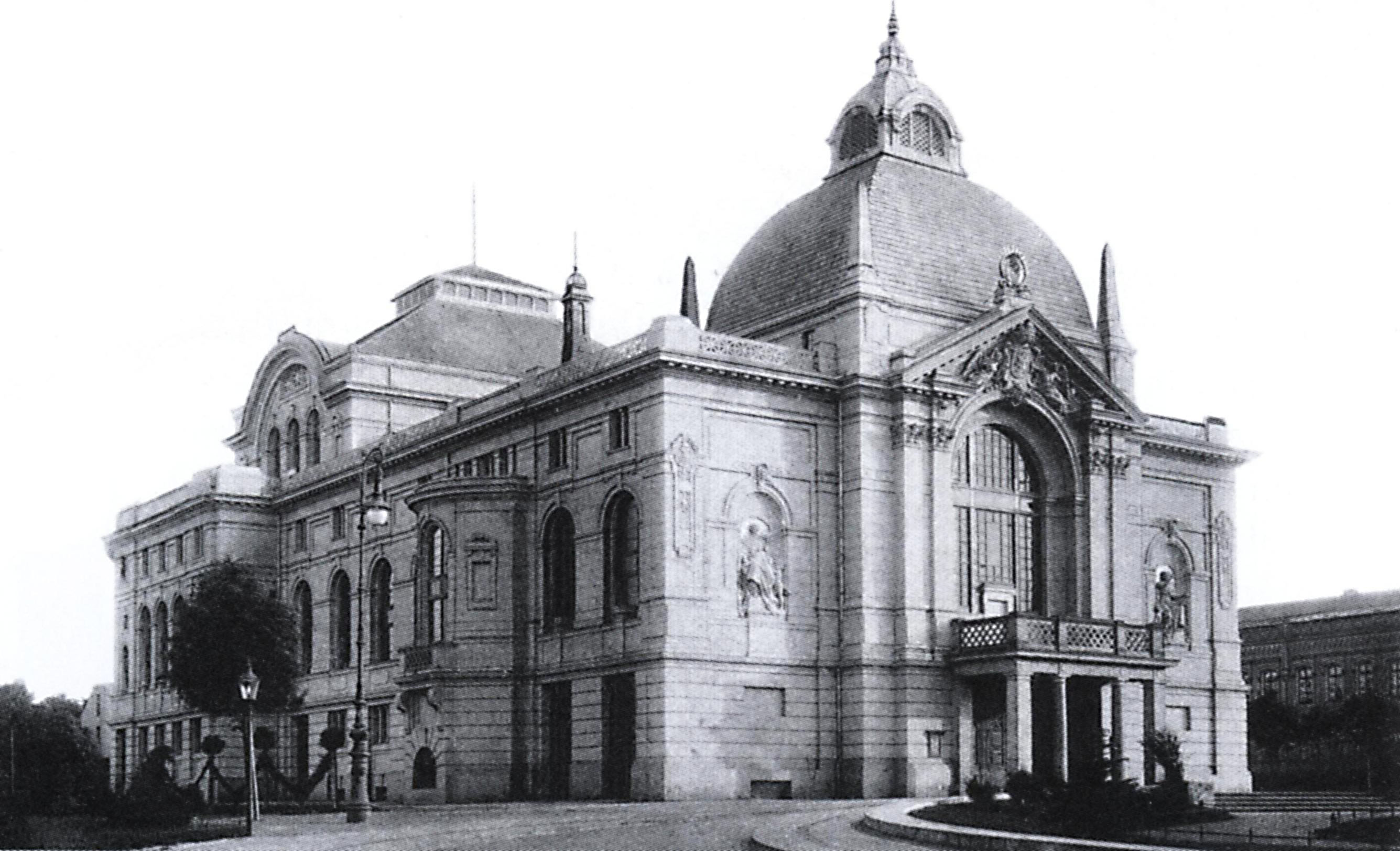
Stadttheater Rostock (1895 to 1942)

The Volkstheater Rostock (Rostock People's Theatre) is the municipal theatre of the Hanseatic city of Rostock. It has three venues: the Großes Haus, the Theater im Stadthafen and the Kleine Komödie and puts on plays, musical theatre/opera, ballet and orchestral concerts. Norddeutsche Philharmonie Rostock is the orchestra for musical theatre and concerts. There is a children's theatre and a theatre youth club.

== History ==
Prior to World War II, the Stadttheater Rostock was the major municipal theatre in the city of Rostock from its opening in 1895 until its destruction in an air raid in 1942. The Volkstheater Rostock was established in 1951 as a means of restarting a municipal theatre company in the city. To this end the Philharmonie, the concert hall of the Norddeutsche Philharmonie Rostock, was repurposed as the new home of the Volkstheater Rostock. That space, now the Theater im Stadthafen, underwent several renovations to accommodate its new more varied performance needs.
