= Francesco Nicolosi =

Italian musician

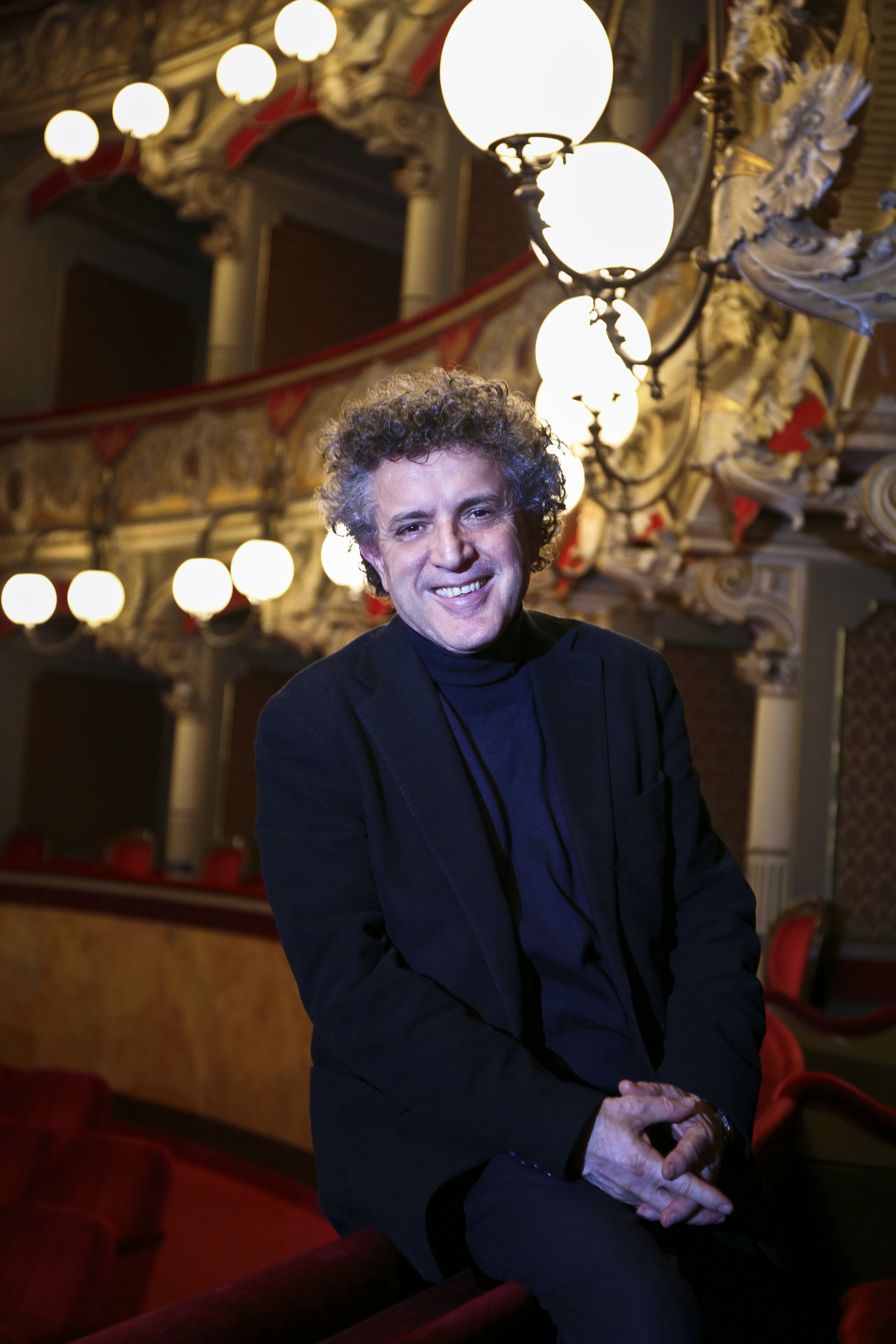

Francesco Nicolosi (born 7 December 1954) is an Italian pianist.

== Biography ==
Nicolosi was born in Catania, Italy. He has lived in Naples, Italy since 1973 where he studied with Vincenzo Vitale. Since 1996 he is the president of the Sigismund Thalberg International Study Centre. In 1998 he founded the Franz Liszt Piano Duo with pianist Vittorio Bresciani with the aim of promoting Liszt's symphonic works in two-piano versions.

He is Artistic Director of the Sigismund Thalberg International Piano Prize and until 2015 he was Artistic Director in many important Italian summer festivals such as "I concerti d'Estate a Villa Guariglia" in Vietri sul mare, "Jeux d'art a Villa d'Este" in Tivoli, "Roccaraso in Musica" and of the International Piano Masterclass in Naples and Rome.

Nicolosi is also frequently invited to sit on the juries of music competitions.

From 2015 to 2019 he was Artistic Director of Teatro Massimo Bellini of Catania.

He is currently President of the Advisory Commission for Music of the Italian Ministry of Culture

== Thalberg recordings ==
In 1989, he began to record with Naxos Records on its Marco Polo imprint. All Thalberg's Paraprases on Italian Opera were included in his recording as well as the Piano Concerto and the Soirées de Pausilippe. The series comprises 8 full-length CDs. The last Thalberg disc was recorded in October 1995.

== Awards ==
- 1980: Third Prize at the Paloma O'Shea Santander International Piano Competition
- 1980: Second Prize at the Concours International d'Exécution Musicale in Geneva.
- 1994: Prize "Gold Bellini" (previously awarded to artists such as Maria Callas, Riccardo Muti, Luciano Pavarotti, etc.)
- 2012: "Note nell'Olimpo" Prize
- 2012 "Domenico Danzuso" Prize
- 2013 "Cosimo Fanzago" Prize
- 2017 Sergei Rachmaninov International Award (nomination: "Special Project in the name of Rachmaninov")
- 2021 "Pietro Golia" Prize

== Performance and recordings ==
Nicolosi has played recitals and as a soloist with prestigious orchestras in some of the most famous concert halls in the world: Queen Elizabeth Hall and Wigmore Hall in London, Victoria Hall of Geneva, Radio Nacional in Madrid, Salle Gaveau in Paris, Teatro alla Scala and Sala Verdi in Milan, Teatro dell’Opera and Accademia di Santa Cecilia in Rome, Teatro di San Carlo in Naples, Herkulessaal in Munich, Brahmssaal in Vienna, Kennedy Center in Washington, Megaron in Athens among others.

He has toured in Iceland, the United States, Argentina, Russia, Japan, China, Canada, and Singapore, and is a regular guest at festivals such as the Festival dei Due Mondi in Spoleto, Rossini Opera Festival, Ravenna Festival, Festival di Ravello, Festival Pianistico Internazionale di Brescia e Bergamo, Taormina Teatro Musica, Settimane Musicali in Stresa, Estate Musicale Sorrentina, Settembre Musica in Turin, Leuciana Festival, Marathon Internacional in Seville, Festival de Musique in Menton, Rencontres Musicales en Artois, Weimar Kunstfest, Budapest Liszt Festival, and many others.

The Corriere della Sera critic and musicologist Paolo Isotta wrote of Nicolosi on the occasion of the recent recording of two rare concerts of Paisiello: (...) listening to him playing is enough to remind us that no one today can match his luminosity of sound, his ability to draw out the song-like legato qualities of a keyboard instrument ... he has acquired a reputation as one of our greatest living pianists ... The great Arturo Benedetti Michelangeli performed eighteenth-century works, his inspiration came principally from the same source as Nicolosi’s, but perhaps lacked some of the latter’s lucidity and coherence. Nicolosi is now perfecting the process begun by Michelangeli.

His recordings include works of Thalberg, Mozart (complete piano variations), Rachmaninoff, Clara Schumann, Scarlatti, and Paisiello (complete piano concertos). Nicolosi's website provides a complete list.

== Reception ==
A review of Complete Keyboard Sonatas, Vol. 9 for Classics Today said, "Francesco Nicolosi’s Scarlatti playing is unabashedly pianistic in its wide dynamic range, discreet octave transpositions in the bass register, and liberal yet never garish use of the sustain pedal."
