= Elias Parish Alvars =

English harpist and composer (1808–1849)

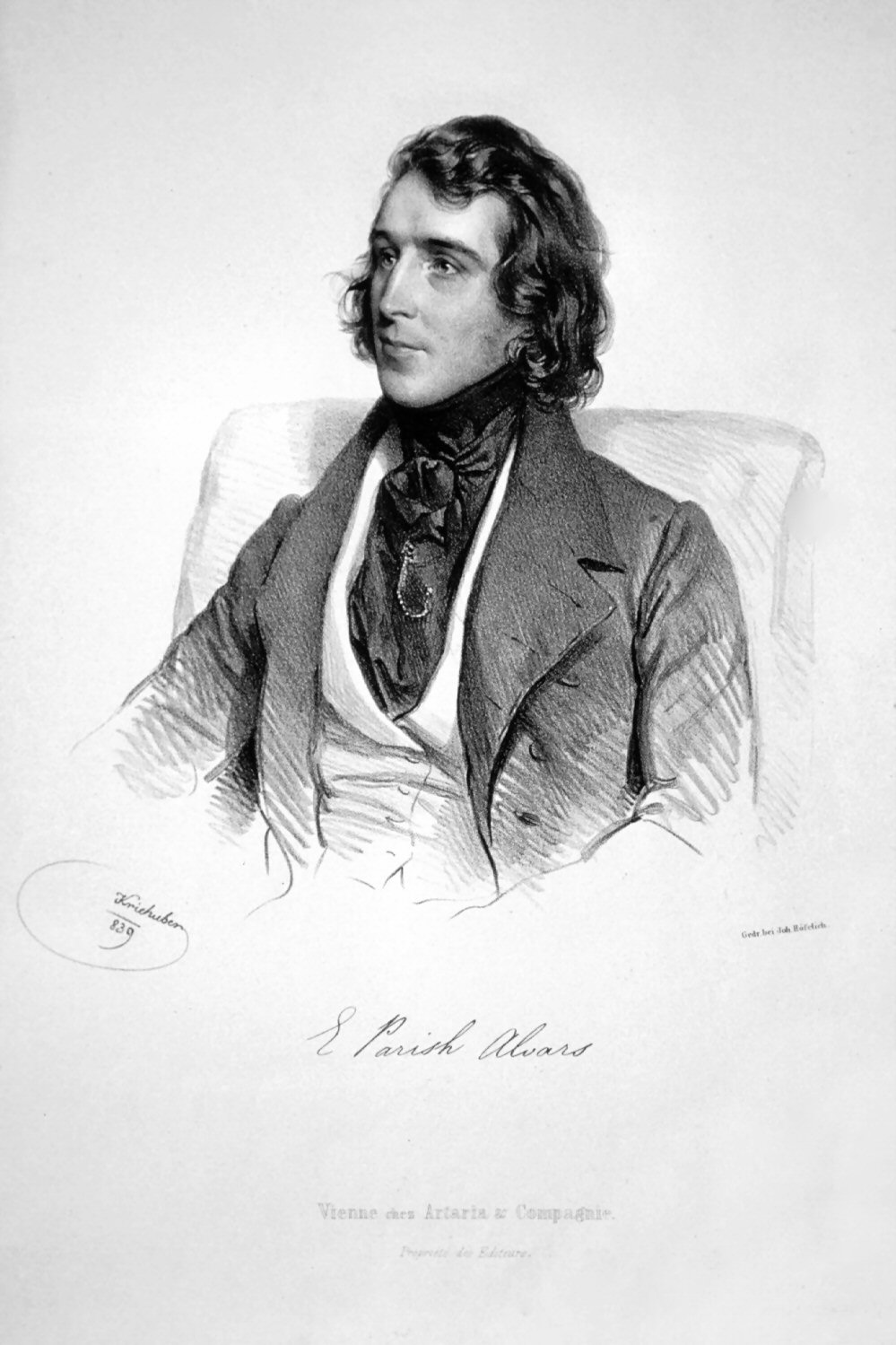
Elias Parish Alvars

Elias Parish Alvars (surname sometimes given as Parish-Alvars), (28 February 1808 – 25 January 1849) was an English harpist and composer. He was born as Eli Parish in Teignmouth, Devon; his father was a local organist. His baptismal record at St James’s Church, West Teignmouth, reads: "Eli, son of Joseph and Mary Ann Parish".

Parish gave his first concert in Totnes in 1818 and in 1820 was sent to London to study with Nicolas-Charles Bochsa. In 1822 he applied to the Royal Academy of Music, where Bochsa had been appointed harp professor, but was not accepted, because he could not afford the tuition fees without a scholarship. He was able to continue his lessons with Bochsa by undertaking teaching and playing at dances. He was also later able to study in Paris, and in 1828 studied music in Florence. At around this time he changed his first name to "Elias"; Parish appears to have used the name "Parish Alvars" from the early 1830s; the origins of the name are not known. In 1836, the first publication of his music by Artaria in Vienna used the name "Elias Parish Alvars", which was subsequently used in all his publications.

In 1836 Alvars became first harp at the Vienna Opera. His 1838 Fantasia, op. 35, is dedicated to Sigismond Thalberg, who is said to have been inspired by Alvars's playing to develop his own three-hand effect piano technique. Alvars's tour of the Near East in the period 1838 to 1842 resulted in his suite Voyage d'un harpiste en l' Orient, op. 79.

In 1842 Alvars married the harpist Melanie Lewy, a member of a Vienna-based family of musicians with whom Alvars frequently performed. His pupils included Charlotte Rothschild of the Rothschild family, to whom he dedicated his Serenade, Op. 83. In the same year he acquired a double-action pedal harp designed by Pierre Érard; the innovations he was able to bring to harp technique using this new instrument impressed many of his fellow musicians including Hector Berlioz, Felix Mendelssohn and Franz Liszt. Liszt wrote of Alvars "From beneath his forehead speak his dreamy eyes, expressive of the glowing imagination which lives in his compositions"; Berlioz called him "the Liszt of the harp".

In 1847 Alvars was appointed chamber musician to Ferdinand I of Austria. That year his Concertino for Harp and Orchestra, Op. 34 was published in Paris with the enthusiastic endorsement of Berlioz. His last performance was in Vienna, at a concert of his own compositions, in January 1848.

On 13 March 1848 riots erupted in Vienna and in April amid the general confusion. Alvars found himself in serious financial straits. His health worsened suddenly and he died, probably of pneumonia, on 25 January 1849. He was buried in the St. Marx Cemetery.
