= Francesco Pollini =

Italian pianist, composer and academic (1762–1846)

Francesco Giuseppe Pollini (25 March 1762 – 17 September 1846) was an Italian pianist, composer and academic.

== Life ==
Pollini was born in Ljubljana (now in Slovenia) in 1762, the son of a medical doctor. He moved to Vienna in 1783 and was a student there of Wolfgang Amadeus Mozart. He returned to Ljubljana, performing there as a singer and actor. In Italy, he appeared as a pianist, violinist and opera singer, appearing in several cities. From 1790 he lived mainly as a piano teacher in Milan, where in 1793 he took lessons from Niccolò Antonio Zingarelli. He made guest appearances in Paris and in German cities. From 1809 he was a professor of piano at Milan Conservatory; he died in Milan in 1846.

Pollini was highly regarded by his contemporaries; Vincenzo Bellini dedicated the opera La sonnambula to him.

== Works ==
He composed piano music, which demands a virtuoso technique; chamber music; two operas (Il genio insubre and La casetta nei boschi); a Stabat Mater and other church music. His instruction book for pianists, Metodo pel clavicembalo, was used as a textbook at Milan Conservatory.

== The three-hand effect ==
He is associated with the three-hand effect of piano playing; his biographer in A Dictionary of Music and Musicians (1900) wrote that he may be "considered as an inventor, having anticipated Sigismond Thalberg in the extended grasp of the keyboard by the use of three staves (as in Thalberg's Fantasia on 'God save the Queen,' and 'Rule Britannia')—thus enabling the player to sustain a prominent melody in the middle region of the instrument, while each hand is also employed with elaborate passages above and beneath it". The technique "appears indeed to have been originated by Pollini in his Uno de' trentadue Esercizi in forma di toccata". This piece, published in 1820, was dedicated to Giacomo Meyerbeer; the original edition contained a preface addressed to that composer by Pollini, which includes the following passage explaining the construction of the Toccata: "I propose to offer a simple melody more or less plain, and of varied character, combined with accompaniments of different rhythms, from which it can be clearly distinguished by a particular expression and touch in the cantilena in contrast to the accompaniment".
