= Thalberg =

Thalberg or Talberg is a surname of German origin, which means "valley hill". It may refer to:

- Irving Thalberg (1899–1936), American film producer
- Irving Thalberg Jr. (1930–1988), American philosopher
- Norma Thalberg (1902–1983), Canadian actress
- Ole Talberg (born 1982), Norwegian football player
- Ruben Talberg (born 1964), German artist
- Sigismond Thalberg (1812–1871), Austrian composer
- Zare Thalberg (1858–1915), English opera soprano and actress

== Other uses ==
- Burg Thalberg, a castle in Styria, Austria
- Irving G. Thalberg Memorial Award
- Schlag bei Thalberg, a municipality in Styria, Austria

== See also ==
- Tallberg
