= Three-hand effect =

Method of playing piano

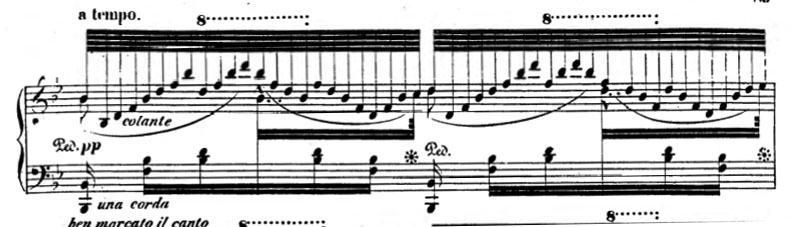
Excerpt from Thalberg's Moïse fantasy illustrating the "three-hand" effect, and indicating use of piano pedals

The three-hand effect (or three-hand technique) is a means of playing on the piano with only two hands, but producing the impression that one is using three hands. Typically this effect is produced by keeping the melody in the middle register, with accompanying arpeggios in the treble and bass registers.

== History ==
The effect had been prefigured by composers including Francesco Pollini (1762–1846), a pupil of Mozart, whose 32 esercizi for the piano (1829), based on techniques found in the keyboard music of Johann Sebastian Bach and Jean-Philippe Rameau, included music written on three staves, and using interlocking hand positions, to generate the impression of three, or even four, hands. Another early example exists in an 1817 caprice in E-flat major by Alexandre Boëly. This four-voiced composition has two melodies in bass and treble, with a third melody harmonized in sixths played simultaneously between them.

In Paris of the 1830s, bravura piano technique became very fashionable. Various intricate problems in piano playing were solved during this period, and unusual techniques invented. Advances in piano technology also enabled innovative techniques. Sigismond Thalberg employed a three-hand effect in his Fantasy on Don Juan (1833–34) and subsequently gained great success using it in his Fantasy on Rossini's Moïse (1835). Thalberg primarily used the technique in settings of other composers' works. Arthur Loesser describes his style as "drawing scarves of quick arpeggios" above and below a melody. He adds "[Thalberg's] clever shading that helped make this device convincing: since the accompanying arpeggios were very soft, the resonance of the well brought out melody tones...could seem to 'sing'." Moriz Rosenthal alleged that Thalberg had adapted this effect from the harp technique of Elias Parish Alvars (1808–1849). A contemporary review of Thalberg playing in London mentioned "myriads of notes sounding from one extremity of the instrument to the other without disturbing the subject, in which the three distinct features of this combination are clearly brought out by his exquisite touch." Carl Czerny noted that the technique also required careful novel use of the piano pedals, especially the sustaining pedal; normally having been used to sustain notes in the bass register, Thalberg applied it "to the notes of the middle and higher octaves, and thereby [produced] entirely new effects, which had hitherto never been imagined." Thalberg's entry in Grove Music Online is more circumspect, explaining that "Thalberg's basic compositional method was relatively simple, consisting of placing the melody in the centre of the keyboard first in one hand, then in the other (the thumbs and the sustaining pedal used in particular to prolong the sound), and ornamenting it with florid counterpoint and chords above and below", and concluding that "Thalberg's compositions are of questionable value". Douglas Bomberger has commented "Thalberg has come to represent the excesses of the romantic period, when bigger was better and two hands could sound like three."

Franz Liszt, initially condemning Thalberg's use of this technique, later adopted it himself, for example in his Grandes études on themes of Paganini. By 1840, Felix Mendelssohn, inspired by hearing Thalberg play, was occasionally using this technique in his own compositions. The style became part of the repertoire of many virtuoso pianist-composers of the 19th century.

Ferruccio Busoni composed six studies for three hands, "Book 4: 'For Three Hands'" of the second edition of his Klavierübung (published posthumously in 1925), which exhibit different versions of three-hand effect. The studies include transcriptions of music by Bach, Beethoven, Schubert, Offenbach, and Busoni himself.

Kenneth Hamilton comments that "[Thalberg's] inheritance is still with us today, as anyone will testify who has ever heard a cocktail pianist wreath a slow popular tune in elegant arpeggios."

== Three-hand effect pieces ==
This is a partial list of two-hand piano compositions intended or arranged to create the illusion of three hands playing simultaneously.

- Alexandre Boëly: Caprice Op. 2, no. 12 in E-flat major, allegro non troppo (1816)
- Sigismond Thalberg: Fantasia on Rossini's Moses, Op. 33 (1837)
- Felix Mendelssohn: Prelude in E minor, from Op. 35, no. 1 (1840)
- Franz Liszt: "Réminiscences de Norma", S.394 (1841); Concert Étude No. 3 "Un sospiro" (1845–49)
