= Nelly Moore =

English actress (1844–1869)

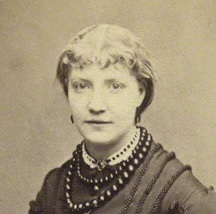
- Eleanora (Nelly) Moore in 1860s
- Born: 1844/5
- Died: 12 January 1869; London

Nelly Moore or Eleanora Moore (1844/45 – 12 January 1869) was a British actress who died young.

== Life ==
Moore died in London in 1869 aged 24 years old from typhoid fever. She first acted in Manchester and appeared in London at the St James's Theatre in the first showing of Cupid's Ladder by Leicester Buckingham. After that she returned to work under Alfred Wigan as Margaret Lovell in Tom Taylor's Up at the Hills. In a short life Moore appeared in the first showing of several notable performances at the Haymarket Theatre, the Queen's and the Princesses. One of her performances moved Henry Sambrooke Leigh to write a verse in her honour. She came from an acting family. Her biography was included in the Dictionary of National Biography.

It was said that Henry Irving who had been a colleague of Moore's died carrying a photograph of Nelly that he had pasted back to back with his own. This caused some speculation but later research identifies the woman in Irving's photograph as Ethel Western aka Zaré Thalberg.
