= Tallberg =

Tallberg or Tällberg is a surname of Scandinavian origin. It may refer to:

- Bertil Tallberg (1883–1963), Finnish sailor
- Georg Tallberg (born 1961), Finnish sailor
- Gunnar Tallberg (1881–1931), Finnish sailor
- Henrik Tallberg (born 1942), Finnish sailor
- Johan Tallberg (born 1948), Finnish sailor
- Julius Tallberg (1857–1921), Finnish businessman
- Per-Inge Tällberg (born 1967), Swedish ski jumper
- Peter Tallberg (1937–2015), Finnish sailor
- Staffan Tällberg (born 1970), Swedish ski jumper
- Teemu Tallberg (born 1991), Finnish ice hockey player

== See also ==
- Tällberg, a village in Sweden
- Thalberg
