= Zaré Thalberg =

British operatic singer and actress

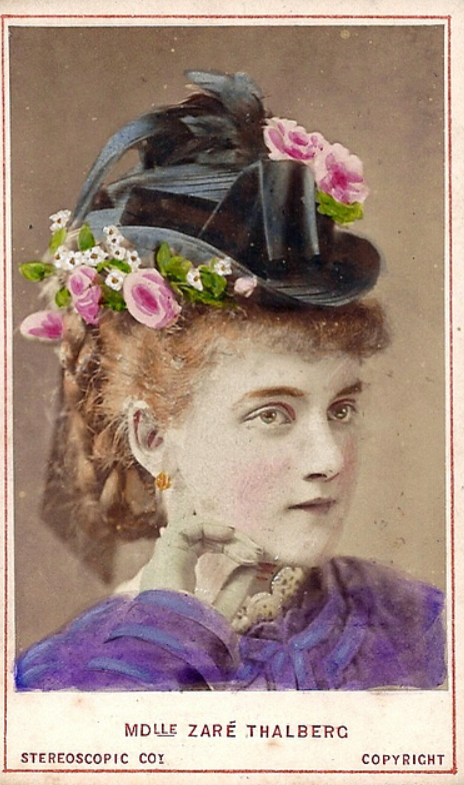
- Thalberg in 1877
- Born: Ethel Western; 16 April 1858; Derbyshire, England
- Died: 17 March 1915 (aged 56)
- Occupations: Opera soprano, actress

Zaré Thalberg, born Ethel Western, (16 April 1858 – 17 March 1915) was a British operatic singer and actress who was thought at one time to have been born in Greece.

== Life ==
Thalberg was born in Derbyshire in 1858. Her name was Ethel Western and she took the name of Thalberg after taking singing lessons from the pianist Sigismond Thalberg. She debuted at the Royal Opera House in London as Zerlina in Mozart's Don Giovanni after training in Paris and Milan.

In 1879 her voice gave way and she was obliged to give up her career at Covent Garden. However, she joined Edwin Booth as an actress in the United States and did not return to England until the 1890s. She acted under the name of Ethel Western.

Her photo was found in the pocket of Henry Irving after he died. For many years the picture was misidentified as Nelly Moore, who had died in 1869. Much later the picture was identified as Thalberg. The Irving Society offer no rationale as to why he should have been carrying her photo as there is no evidence that they did (or did not) know each other.

There are photos of her in the National Portrait Gallery, London, appearing in Lucretia Borgia in the 1890s.
