= Sigismond Thalberg =

Austrian composer and pianist (1812–1871)

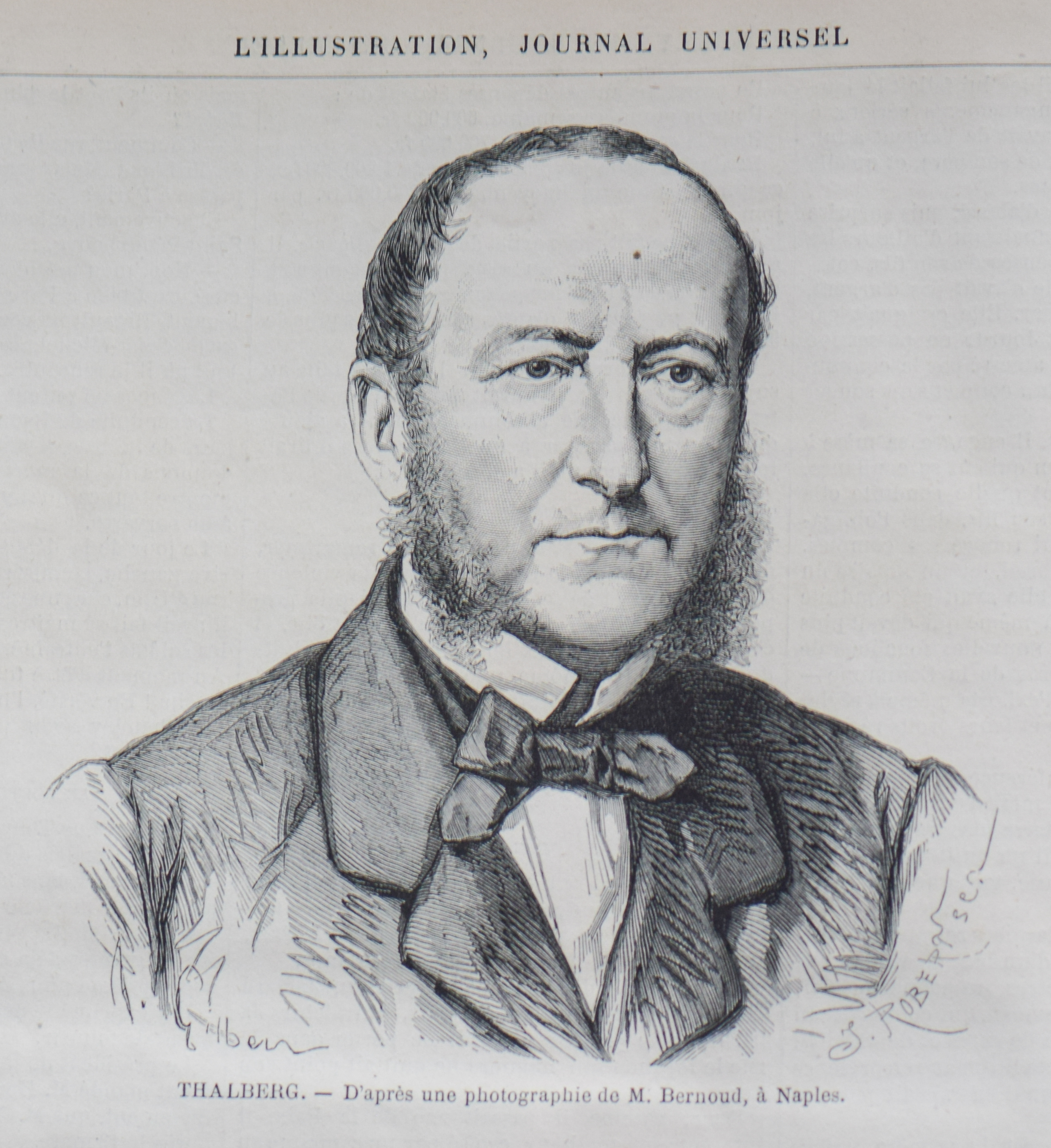
- From L'Illustration Tome LVII 1871, a weekly illustrated newspaper published in Paris
- Born: 8 January 1812; Pâquis, Switzerland
- Died: 27 April 1871 (aged 59); Naples, Kingdom of Italy
- Occupations: Pianist; Composer

Sigismond Thalberg (Note: There are many variants of his name in use. Some authors wrote "Sigismund Fortuné François", whereas others gave only "Sigismund". In Italy, he is usually called "Sigismondo"; and in France, as well as in the English-speaking world, the most commonly used form is "Sigismond". Thalberg himself usually signed as "S. Thalberg", but at his wedding used the form "F.J.S. Thalberg", which can be inferred as either "François Joseph Sigismund" or "François Joseph Sigismond" Thalberg. Without pretending to decide which variant is to be regarded as correct, in the present article only the form "Sigismond" will be used.) (8 January 1812 – 27 April 1871) was an Austrian composer and one of the most distinguished virtuoso pianists of the 19th century.

== Family ==
Thalberg was born in Pâquis near Geneva on 8 January 1812. Thalberg asserted that he was an illegitimate son of Moritz, Prince of Dietrichstein and his mistress Maria Julia Bydeskuty von Ipp, from a family of Hungarian lower nobility. In 1820, Julia married Baron Alexander Ludwig Wetzlar von Plankenstern (from an ennobled Jewish Viennese family). According to Thalberg's birth certificate, he was the son of Joseph Thalberg and Fortunée Stein, both from Frankfurt-am-Main.

== Early life ==
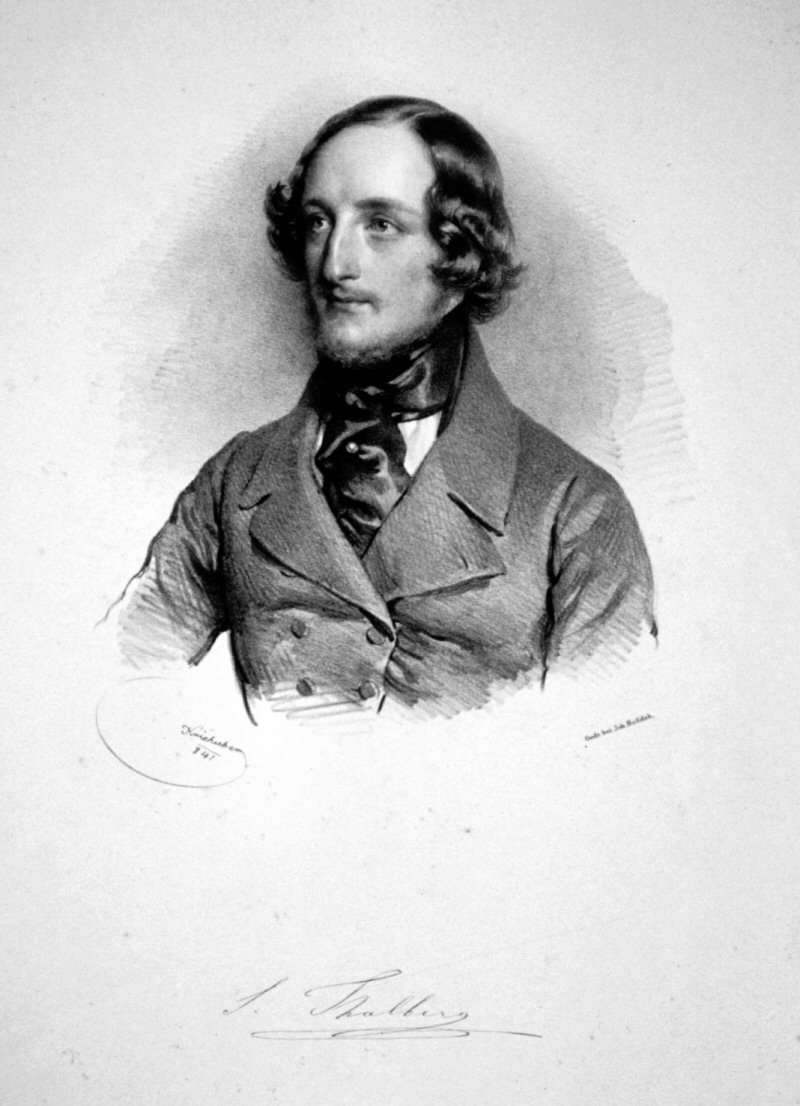
Sigismond Thalberg

Little is known about Thalberg's childhood and early youth. It is possible that his mother had brought him to Vienna at the age of 10 (the same year in which the 10-year-old Franz Liszt arrived there with his parents). According to Thalberg's own account, he attended the first performance of Beethoven's 9th Symphony on 7 May 1824, in the Kärntnerthortheater.

There is no evidence as to Thalberg's early teachers. Baroness von Wetzlar, his putative mother, who, according to Wurzbach, was occupied with his education during his childhood and early youth, was a brilliant amateur pianist. It may be, therefore, that she gave him his first instruction at the piano.

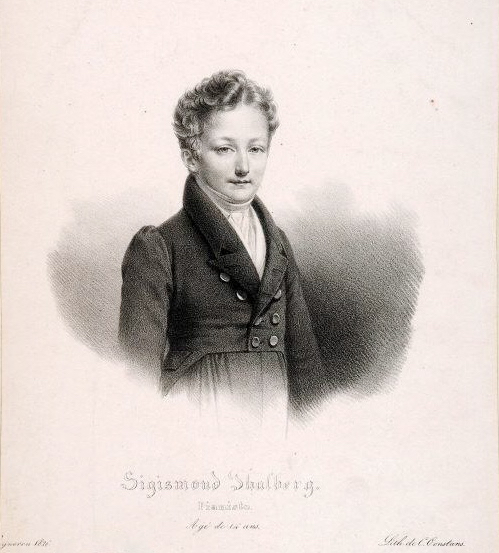
Thalberg in 1826

In spring 1826, Thalberg studied with Ignaz Moscheles in London. Moscheles, according to a letter to Felix Mendelssohn dated 14 August 1836, had the impression that Thalberg had already reached a level at which no further help would be needed in order to become a great pianist. Thalberg's first public performance in London was on 17 May 1826. In Vienna, 6 April 1827, he played the first movement of Hummel's Piano Concerto No. 3 in B minor, later playing the Adagio and the Rondo on 6 May 1827. After this, Thalberg performed regularly in Vienna. His repertoire was mainly classical, including concertos by Hummel, Mozart, and Beethoven. He also performed chamber music. In the year 1827, his Op. 1, a fantasy and variations on melodies from Carl Maria von Weber's Euryanthe, was published by Tobias Haslinger.

In 1830, Thalberg met Mendelssohn and Frédéric Chopin in Vienna. Their letters show their opinion that Thalberg's main strength was his astonishing technical skills. Further information can be found in the diary of the 10-year-old Clara Wieck. She had heard Thalberg on 14 May 1830 at a concert which he gave in the theatre of Leipzig. He had played his own Piano Concerto in F minor, Op. 5 and a fantasy that he had also composed. Two days before, Clara had played the first solo of John Field's Piano Concerto No. 2 to Thalberg, and, together with him, the first movement of Hummel's Sonata for Piano 4-Hands, Op. 51. Her diary, edited by her father Friedrich Wieck, notes Thalberg as "very accomplished". His playing was clear and precise, also being very strong and expressive.

In the early 1830s, Thalberg studied counterpoint under the theorist Simon Sechter. As a result, passages of canon and fugue can be found in some of Thalberg's fantasies of this time. An example is his Grande fantaisie et variations sur 'Norma', Op. 12, which contains a march-theme and variations (one of them a canon), and a fugue on a lyrical theme. The fantasy was published in 1834 and became very popular; but on publication, it was criticised by some—for example, by Robert Schumann.

Thalberg successfully changed his composing style, reducing the counterpoint. Several works in his new style, among them the 2 Airs russes variés, Op. 17, were even enthusiastically praised by Schumann.

== Early virtuoso career ==
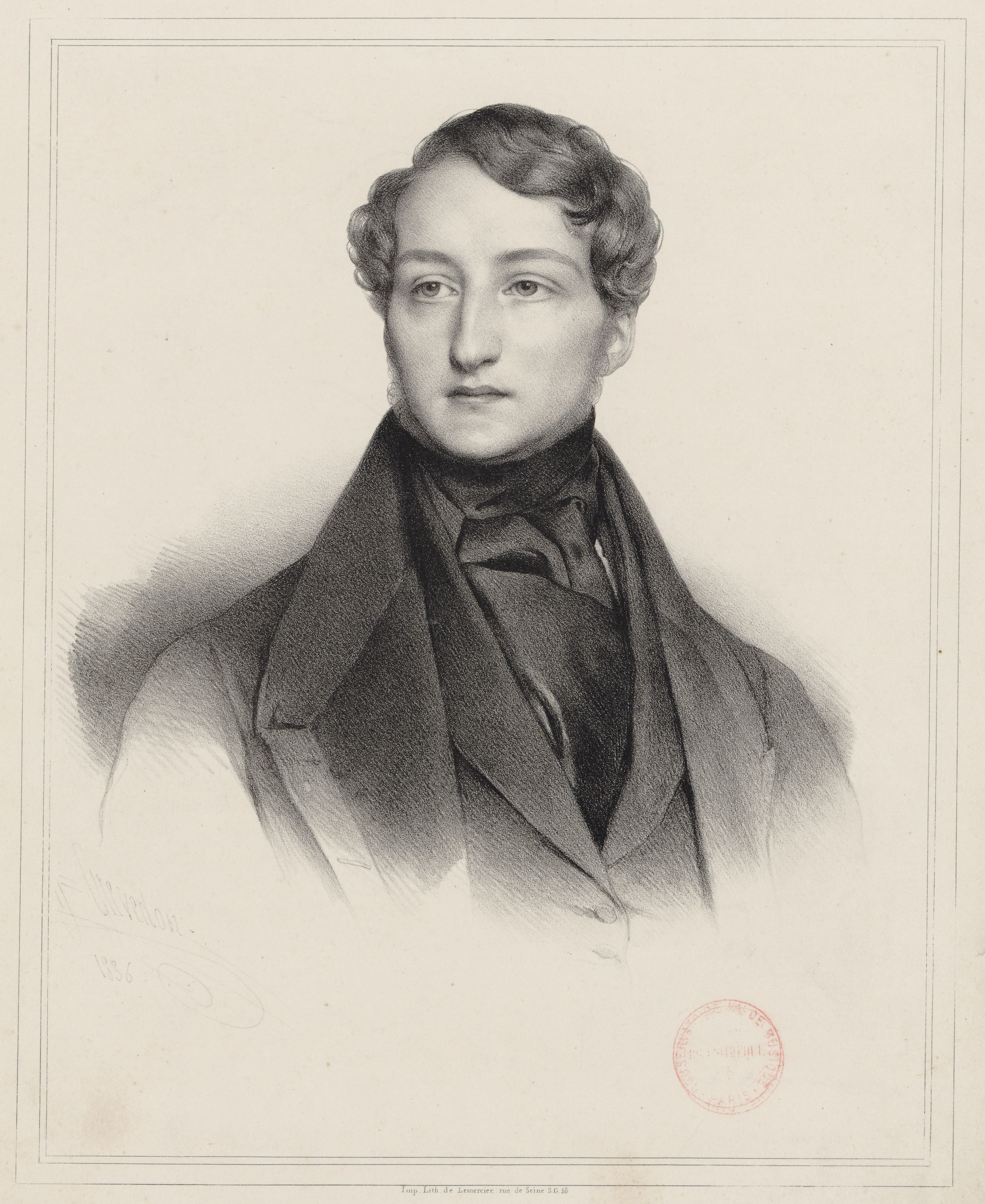
Thalberg in 1836

In November 1835, Thalberg arrived in Paris. He performed on 16 November 1835 at a private concert of the Austrian ambassador Count Rudolph Apponyi. On 24 January 1836, he took part in a concert of the "Society of the Paris Conservatoire concerts", playing his Grande fantaisie, Op. 22. Thalberg was praised by many of the most prominent artists, among them Rossini and Meyerbeer.

Chopin didn't share his fellow artists' enthusiasm. After hearing Thalberg play in Vienna, Chopin wrote:

He plays splendidly, but he's not my man. He's younger than I and pleases the ladies—makes potpourris on La Muette—produces his piano and forte with the pedal, not the hand—takes tenths as I do octaves and wears diamond shirt studs.

His début at the Conservatoire concert was in the Revue et gazette musicale of 31 January 1836, enthusiastically reviewed by Hector Berlioz. Le Ménestrel of 13 March 1836 wrote:

Moscheles, Kalkbrenner, Chopin, Liszt and Herz are and will always be for me great artists, but Thalberg is the creator of a new art which I do not know how to compare to anything that existed before him . . . Thalberg is not only the premier pianist of the world, he is also an extremely distinguished composer.

On 16 April 1836, Thalberg gave his first solo concert in Paris, and the success was again sensational. According to Apponyi's diary, Thalberg made a profit of 10,000 francs (say 5000 bottles of fine Burgundy wine of €12 or US$13 a bottle in 2024 money), a sum that no virtuoso had gained before from a single concert.

Liszt had heard of Thalberg's successes during the winter 1835–36 in Geneva, in spring 1836 in Lyon, and in Paris. In his letter to Marie d'Agoult of 29 April 1836, he compared himself to the exiled Napoleon. In a review of 8 January 1837, in the Revue et Gazette musicale, Liszt controversially denigrated Thalberg's compositions.

After Thalberg returned to Paris in the beginning of February 1837, a rivalry developed between him and Liszt. On 4 February, Thalberg heard Liszt play in concert for the first time in his life. Thalberg was stupefied. While Liszt then gave over a dozen concerts, Thalberg gave only one concert on 12 March 1837 in the Paris Conservatoire, and a further concert on 2 April 1837. In addition, on 31 March 1837, both Liszt and Thalberg played at a benefit concert to raise money for Italian refugees.

In May 1837, Thalberg gave a concert in London, following which The Athenaeum gave an enthusiastic review. Such enthusiasm followed Thalberg throughout the following years. His Fantasia on Rossini's 'Moses', Op. 33 became one of the most famous concert pieces of the 19th century, and was still praised by Berlioz in his Mémoires (1870). The fantasy was published at the end of March 1839; in May 1839, Clara Schumann studied and was delighted by it. In 1848, the fantasy was played by Liszt's daughter Blandine.

== European tours ==
=== First steps ===
After Thalberg's stay in London in May 1837, he made a first, short tour, giving concerts in several towns in Great Britain, but he became ill and soon returned to Vienna. In spring 1838, he gave concerts in Paris again. A note in the Revue et Gazette musicale of 4 March 1838 shows that Thalberg's fame had in the meantime grown. He was now called "the most famous of our composers". Thalberg left Paris on 18 April 1838, travelling to Vienna, the very same day that Liszt gave there a charity concert for the benefit of the victims of a flood in Hungary. Thalberg invited Liszt for dinner, and the two great pianists dined together on the 28th with Prince Moritz Dietrichstein, who told Liszt that he was delighted to have "Castor and Pollux" together in his home. During the evening, Thalberg remarked to Liszt with admirable candour: "In comparison with you, I have never enjoyed more than a succes d'estime in Vienna". They dined again the next day, after Liszt's concert on 29 April 1838. Liszt and Thalberg were both dinner guests of Metternich. During Liszt's stay in Vienna, Thalberg did not perform at all.

In October 1838, Thalberg became acquainted with Schumann. According to Schumann's diary, Thalberg played from memory études by Chopin, Joseph Christoph Kessler, and Ferdinand Hiller. He also played with great skill and inspiration works by Beethoven, Schubert, and Dussek, as well as sight-reading Schumann's Kreisleriana, Op. 16. On 27 November 1838, Thalberg took part in a charity concert, playing his new Fantasia on Rossini's 'La Donna del Lago', Op. 40 ("The Lady of the Lake" after Walter Scott). At one of his own "Farewell concerts" on 1 December 1838, he played three of his 12 Etudes, Op. 26; his Op. 33 (Moses); and his Fantasia on Beethoven's 7th Symphony, Op. 39. As a result, in the Neue Zeitschrift für Musik of 8 March 1839, an enthusiastic review by Schumann of the second book (likely Nos. 6–12) of Thalberg's Op. 26 appeared, concluding "He is a God when sitting at the piano."

=== First extended tour ===
After Thalberg's "Farewell concert" in Vienna, he began his first extended European tour. On 19 and 21 December 1838, he gave two concerts in Dresden, and he performed twice at the Court. Receiving honours from the King of Saxony, he told him, "Wait until you have heard Liszt!" In Leipzig, he gave a concert on 28 December 1838, attended by Mendelssohn, who, on the following day, in a letter to his sister Fanny, gave an enthusiastic account. Mendelssohn became a friend and admirer of Thalberg.

After a second concert in Leipzig on 30 December 1838, Thalberg travelled to Berlin to give a series of concerts there. Via Danzig, Mitau, and other places, he performed at St. Petersburg, receiving excellent reviews. From St. Petersburg, he went on a steamboat to London, where he gave further concerts. He then journeyed to Brussels to meet his violinist friend Charles de Bériot. There, he gave several private performances.

After Brussels, Thalberg arrived in the Rhineland, where he gave a series of concerts with Bériot. He returned to London at the beginning of February 1840, and then travelled from London to Paris together with Baroness Wetzlar, his mother, awaiting the arrival of Liszt.

=== Interlude ===
Thalberg had already announced in December 1838—during his stay in Leipzig—that he would take time off at the end of his tour, and did not perform at any concert during his stay in spring 1840 in Paris.

At this time Mendelssohn, after meeting Liszt, compared him to Thalberg in a letter to his mother:

Thalberg, with his composure, and within his more restricted sphere, is more nearly perfect as a real virtuoso; and after all this is the standard by which Liszt must also be judged, for his compositions are inferior to his playing, and, in fact, are calculated solely for virtuosi.

After the end of the Parisian concert season, Thalberg travelled as tourist in the Rhineland. In the beginning of June 1840, he attended a music festival directed by Louis Spohr in Aachen. He got an invitation from the Russian Tsarina and performed at a court-concert in Bad Ems, but this was his only concert during his stay in the Rhineland. According to a note in the Revue et Gazette musicale of 2 August 1840, Bériot would get married two days later in Elsene (Ixelles). His bride was a young lady, Maria Huber, born in Vienna, from Germany. She was an orphan and had been adopted by Prince von Dietrichstein, Thalberg's father. It may therefore be presumed that Thalberg wanted to take part in the wedding celebration. During previous visits to the Rhineland, he wanted only to relax. He also taught Bériot's son, the pianist Charles-Wilfrid de Bériot.

In the Revue et Gazette musicale of 9 May 1841, an essay by Fétis appeared—Études d'exécution transcendente—in which he praised Liszt for a new composing style which had been stimulated by Thalberg's challenge. In letters to Fétis of 17 May 1841, and to Simon Löwy of 20 May 1841, Liszt agreed with this analysis.

=== 1840–1848 ===
Thalberg performed in Brussels in fall 1840. He then travelled to Frankfurt-am-Main, where he stayed until January 1841. It had been announced that Thalberg would give concerts in Paris again in spring 1841, but he changed his plans. In Frankfurt, he only took part in a charity concert on 15 January 1841, playing his fantasies on La Donna del Lago and Les Huguenots. He was busily composing new works; his Grande fantaisie sur la Sérénade et le Menuet de 'Don Juan', Op. 42 and his Fantasia on Rossini's 'Semiramide', Op. 51 date from this time.

In the second half of January 1841, Thalberg travelled from Frankfurt to Weimar, where he performed three times at the Grand Duke's court and also in the Theatre. He then went to Leipzig, where he visited Mendelssohn and Schumann. On 8 February 1841, he gave a solo concert in Leipzig, enthusiastically reviewed by Schumann, playing his Op. 42 (Don Juan); his Andante final de 'Lucia di Lammermoor', Op. 44; his Theme and Etude, Op. 45; and his Grand Caprice on Bellini's 'La Sonnambula', Op. 46.

Clara Schumann (née Wieck) noted in her diary:

On Monday Thalberg visited us and played to the delightment beautiful on my piano. An even more accomplished mechanism than his does not exist, and many of his piano effects must ravish the connoisseurs. He does not fail a single note, his passages can be compared to rows of pearls, his octaves are the most beautiful ones I ever heard.

Mendelssohn's student Horsley wrote of the meeting of his teacher and Thalberg:

We were a trio, and after dinner Mendelssohn asked Thalberg if he had written anything new, whereupon Thalberg sat down to the piano and played his Fantasia from the "Sonnambula" . . . At the close there are several runs of Chromatique Octaves, which at that time had not previously heard, and of which peculiar passages Thalberg was undoubtedly the inventor. Mendelssohn was much struck with the novel effect produced, and greatly admired its ingenuity . . . he told me to be with him the next afternoon at 2 o'clock. When I arrived at his study door I heard him playing to himself, and practising continually this passage which had so struck him the previous day. I waited for at least half an hour listening in wonderment to the facility with which he applied his own thoughts to the cleverness of Thalberg's mechanism, and then went into the room. He laughed and said: 'Listen to this, is it not almost like Thalberg?'

After his stay in Leipzig, Thalberg gave concerts in Breslau and Warsaw. He then travelled to Vienna and gave two successful concerts there. In a review in the Leipziger Allgemeine musikalische Zeitung, Thalberg was described as Liszt's only rival.

In winter 1841–1842, Thalberg gave concerts in Italy, while Liszt, from the end of December 1841 until the beginning of March 1842, gave a series of concerts in Berlin. Thalberg matched Liszt's successes in Berlin. He then returned via Marseille, Toulon, and Dijon, arriving on 11 April 1842, in Paris. On the next day, he gave his first—and on 21 April, his second—concert. According to an account by Berlioz, Thalberg made a profit of 12,000 francs from his first concert, and one of 13,000 francs from his second. The concerts were reviewed in the Revue et Gazette musicale by Henri Blanchard who—two years before, in his review of Liszt's concert on 20 April 1840—had nominated Thalberg as Cesar, Octavian or Napoleon of the piano. In spring 1842, Blanchard reached for new superlatives, even surpassing his former ones. In his review of Thalberg's second concert, he wrote that Thalberg would in 100 years have been canonized—and by all coming pianists, be invoked with—the name of Holy Thalberg. According to the account by Berlioz, at the end of Thalberg's second concert, a golden crown was thrown onto the stage.

In addition to his own concerts, Thalberg took part in a concert of Émile Prudent. He then travelled via Brussels to London. Later, in 1842, Thalberg was decorated with the Cross of the French Legion of Honour. He travelled to Vienna, where he stayed until fall 1842. In the second half of November until 12 December 1842, he made a further tour in Great Britain, and in January 1843, he returned to Paris. At the end of March 1843, he performed at a private concert of Pierre Erard (nephew of the piano and harp maker Sébastien Érard), but this was his only concert appearance during that season.=

In March 1843, Heinrich Heine wrote about Thalberg:

His performance is so gentlemanly, so entirely without any forced acting the genius, so entirely without that well-known brashness that makes a poor cover for inner insecurity. Healthy women love him. So do sickly women, even though he does not engage their sympathy by epileptic seizures at the piano, even though he does not play at their overstrung, delicate nerves, even though he neither electrifies them nor galvanizes them.

In winter 1843–44, Thalberg gave concerts in Italy again. At the end of March 1844, he returned to Paris, where—at the same time—Liszt was also expected. Liszt arrived on April 8 and gave on 16 April a first concert, at which he played his Réminiscences de Norma, S. 394, published shortly before. When composing this fantasy, Liszt had put many Thalbergian effects into it. In his later years, he told August Göllerich, one of his pupils:

As I met Thalberg, I said to him: 'Here I have cribbed everything from you.' 'Yes,' he replied, 'there are Thalberg-passages included which are indeed indecent.'

Shortly after Liszt's concert on 11 May 1844, Thalberg left Paris. He travelled to London and gave a concert there on 28 May 1844. At a further concert in London, he played a concerto for three pianos by J. S. Bach together with Moscheles and Mendelssohn. He also took part in a concert of Julius Benedict. In August 1844, Thalberg returned to Paris, where he stayed until 1845. During the winter 1844–45, he gave a piano course for selected students at the Paris Conservatoire. On April 2, 1845, he gave a concert in Paris, playing his Fantasia on Rossini's Barber of Seville, Op. 63; his Grande fantaisie sur les motifs de 'Don Pasquale', Op. 67; and his Fantasia on Auber's 'La Muette de Portici', Op. 52—as well as his Marche funèbre, Op. 59 and his Barcarolle, Op. 60.

In spring 1848, in Vienna, Liszt met Thalberg once more. On 3 May 1848, Thalberg gave a benefit concert which Liszt attended. According to an account by his pupil Johann Nepomuk Dunkl, Liszt was sitting on the stage, carefully listening, and loudly applauding. It had been 11 years since he had first heard his rival's playing.

== Concerts in America ==
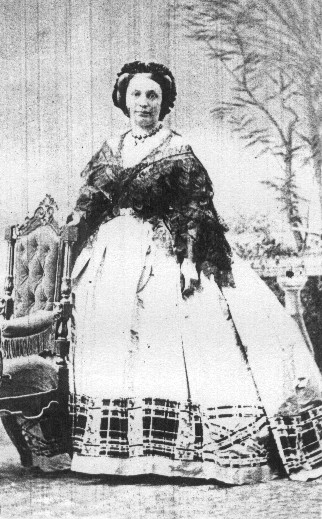
Francesca Lablache, Thalberg's wife

On 22 July 1843, Thalberg married Francesca ("Cecchina"), the eldest daughter of Luigi Lablache, first bass at the Théâtre des Italiens in Paris. Thalberg went with his wife to Italy where they stayed for the winter 1843–44.

In 1855, after Thalberg's operas Florinda, Op. 71 and Cristina di Svezia had failed, he realized his ambition to give concerts in America. From July to December 1855, he performed with overwhelming success in Rio de Janeiro and Buenos Aires. He returned to Europe, but—after a stay of several months in Paris—went on the steamboat Africa to North America, where he arrived on 3 October 1856, in New York. After Thalberg's debut there on 10 November 1856, a performance marathon ensued, during which he spent eight months giving concerts five or six days a week. Occasionally, he gave two or even three concerts a day. On Sundays, concerts were generally only allowed if they presented "sacred music", but several times Thalberg performed anyhow, playing pieces like his Op. 33 (Moses), based on a prayer from Rossini's opera, or his Huguenots-fantasy with the chorale "Ein feste Burg ist unser Gott" as main subject. His Andante, Op. 32 and his Op. 59 (Marche funèbre) were also allowed.

Thalberg's first American season ended with a concert on 29 July 1857 in Saratoga Springs. On 15 September 1857, he gave another concert in New York, starting his second season. With very few intermissions, he was busy until his last concert on 12 June 1858, in Peoria. By then, he had visited nearly 80 cities and given more than 320 regular concerts in the United States, and 20 concerts in Canada. In addition, he gave at least 20 free concerts for many thousands of schoolchildren. Thalberg also gave a series of solo matinées in New York and in Boston at which he played own works as well as chamber music. From 1857, the violinist Henri Vieuxtemps toured with Thalberg. They played works by Beethoven and duos composed by Thalberg.

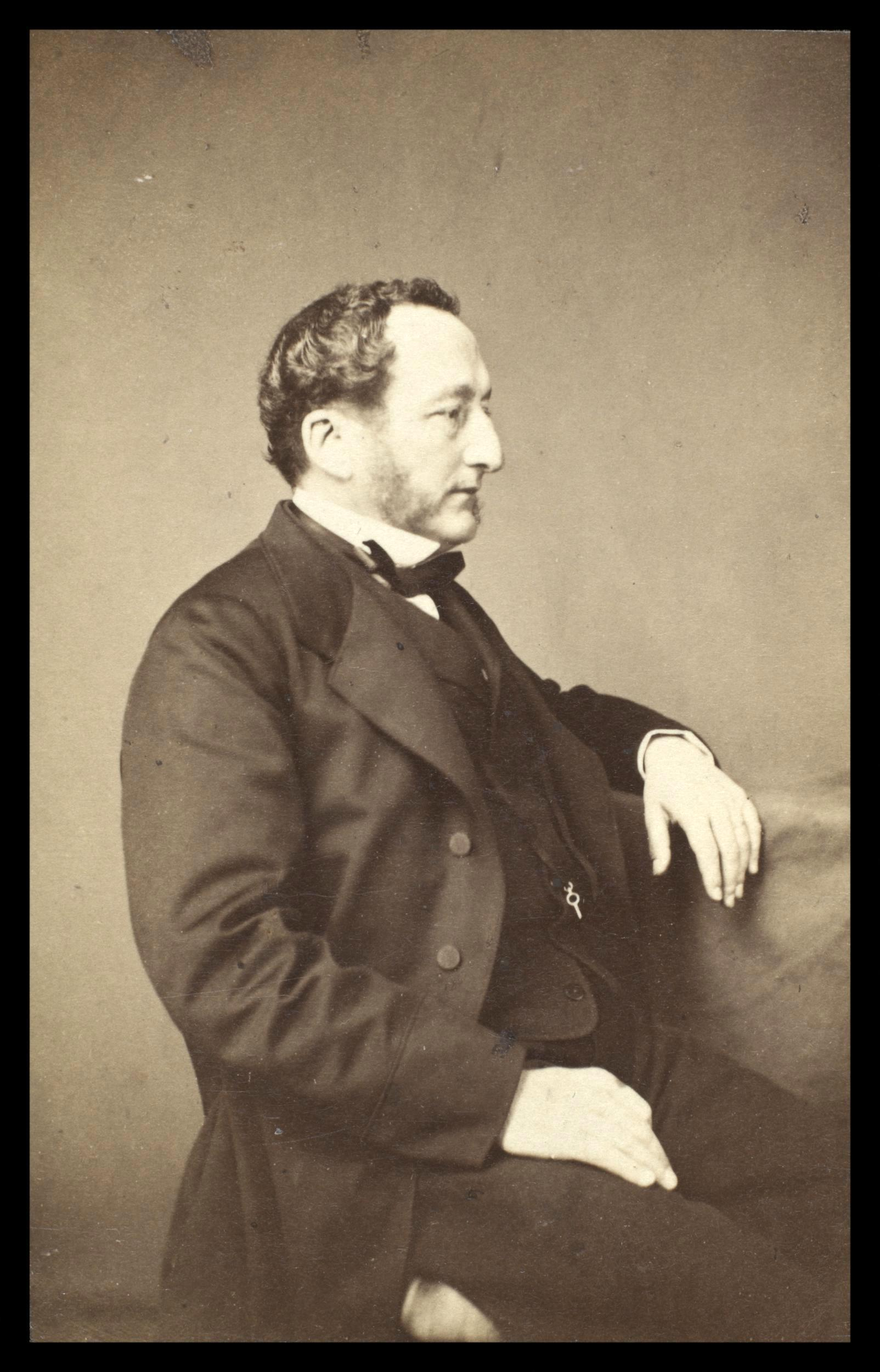
Thalberg c. 1860

Thalberg's financial success on these tours was immense. He got an average of about $500 per concert and probably made more than $150,000 during his two seasons—the equivalent today of about $3 million. A large part of his appeal on these tours was his unpretentious and unassuming personality; he did not resort to advertising gimmicks or cheap crowd-pleasing tricks—instead, he offered superbly polished renditions of his own compositions, which had already been well known in America. Upon rising from the piano after such performances, he was always the same quiet, respectable, self-possessed, middle-aged gentleman that he was at the dinner table of his hotel. He played works by Beethoven, among them the sonatas Nos. 12 ("Funeral March") and 14 ("Moonlight"), as well as the first movements of the Third and Fifth Piano Concertos. His cadenza to Beethoven's third concerto was admired. He also played works by J. S. Bach, Chopin, Hummel, Mendelssohn, and several other composers. The New-York Musical Review and Gazette of July 24, 1858, wrote:

Thalberg . . . quite unexpectedly closed what has been a most brilliant career—completely successful, musically, giving to the talented and genial artist abundance of both fame and money. There is probably not another virtuoso, whether with instrument or voice (Liszt alone excepted), who could have excited a moiety of the enthusiasm, or gathered a fragment of the dollars, which Thalberg has excited and gathered.

The unexpected close referred to the announcement in June 1858 in Chicago that Thalberg would make only one of three scheduled appearances before immediately returning to Europe. In fact, Thalberg did not even perform at that concert, but very hastily left instead. His wife, Francesca, had arrived from Europe following reports that Thalberg had an extra-marital liaison. This caused further confusion when the opera singer Zare Thalberg debuted at Covent Garden in 1875. She had been one of his students, but she was misidentified as his daughter.

== Later years ==
The reason as to why Francesca had left for America and returned, with her husband, to Europe is unknown. The death of Thalberg's father-in-law, Lablache, on 23 January 1858, could be one reason. A further possibility is that there may have been consideration of legitimizing Thalberg to enable him to succeed his natural father, Prince Franz Joseph von Dietrichstein.

There are unsubstantiated reports that, after his return to Europe, Thalberg settled in Posillipo, near Naples, in a villa that had belonged to Lablache. The reality is that he dwelled at Viale Calascione, 5 in the Pizzofalcone section of Naples, not far from the elite Nunziatella Military School. Thalberg's residence at Viale Calascione, 5 is confirmed both by a plaque on the building and by a monument to him in the courtyard.

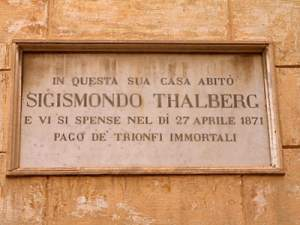
"Sigismond Thalberg lived in this house and died there on April 27, 1871, paid for by immortal triumphs."

For the following four years, Thalberg lived there in silence. In spring 1862, he gave concerts in Paris and London once again, and was as successful as ever. After a last tour in Brazil in 1863, he put an end to his career. He considered taking up a position as a piano professor at the conservatory in Naples, but he did not have the prerequisite of having an Italian nationality. One year later, he received an offer from the same conservatory, but he refused. The claim of Italian pianist and music teacher Vincenzo Vitale that Thalberg published instructive editions of J. S. Bach's "Well-Tempered Clavier" and Muzio Clementi's "Gradus ad Parnassum" has been recently disputed by Italian pianist and musicologist Chiara Bertoglio. When Thalberg died on 27 April 1871, he left behind a collection of several hundred autographs by famous composers, among them J. S. Bach, Handel, Mozart, Haydn, Beethoven, Schubert, and others; even Liszt. The collection was sold after Thalberg's death. He is buried at Naples' Poggioreale cemetery.

== Composer ==
In the 1830s and the 1840s, Thalberg's style was a major force in European piano playing. He was greatly in fashion and was imitated by others. In 1852, Wilhelm von Lenz wrote:

The piano playing of the present day, to tell the truth, consists only of Thalberg simple, Thalberg amended, and Thalberg exaggerated; scratch what is written for the piano, and you will find Thalberg.

Ten years later, on 13 June 1862, a London correspondent of the Revue et gazette musicale wrote:

Thalberg was indeed imitated like no other; his manner was parodied, exaggerated, turned upside down, tortured, and it may have happened to all of us to curse more than once this Thalbergian school which brought us this avalanche of notes, these arpeggios up and down, with, or more often than not without the slightest song in the middle. The apostles have altered the word of the master. But when we return to the source, we are reconciled with him and we prostrate ourselves again, as twenty years ago, as in the time of youth and enthusiasm.

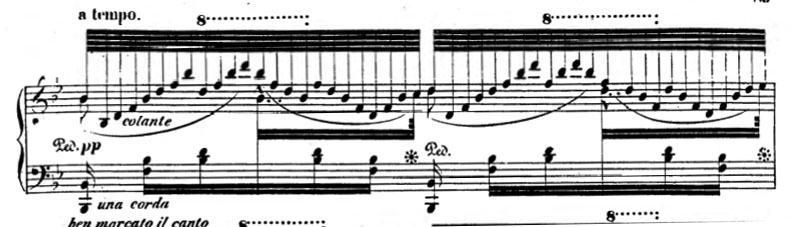
Excerpt from Thalberg's Op. 33 (Moses), showcasing the "three-hand" effect

In the late 19th century, Thalberg's fame had come to depend on his association with a single piano technique: the "three-hand effect". Carl Friedrich Weitzmann, in his Geschichte des Klavierspiels (1879), wrote:

His bravura pieces, fantasies on melodies from Rossini's Mosè and La donna del lago, on motifs from Bellini's Norma and on Russian folk-songs, became extraordinarily popular through his own, brilliant execution; however, they treat their subjects always in one and the same way, [namely] . . . to let the tones of a melody be played in the medium octave of the keyboard now by the thumb of the right, now of the left hand, while the rest of the fingers are executing arpeggios filling the whole range of the keyboard.

== Discography ==
- Grand Concerto pour le piano avec Accompagnement de l’Orchestre, f-minor, op. 5. (Francesco Nicolosi, Razumowsky Symphony Orchestra, A. Mogrelia, NAXOS 8.553701)
- 12 Etudes op. 26, Fantasie op. 33, Fantasie op. 40 (Stefan Irmer, MDG 2009)
- Fantasies on Operas by Bellini opp. 12, 10, 49, 9 (Nicolosi, NAXOS 8.555498)
- Fantasies on Operas by Verdi, Rossini and Bellini opp. 3, 70, 77, 78, 81, 82 (Nicolosi, MARCO POLO 8.223367)
- Fantasies on Operas by Donizetti opp. 68, 67, 50, 44, 66 (Nicolosi, MARCO POLO 8.223365)
- Fantasies on Operas by Rossini opp. 51, 40, 63, 33 (Nicolosi, NAXOS 8.555501)
- Soirees de Pausilippe opp. 75 (Nicolosi, MARCO POLO 8.223807)
- Lacrimosa, Fantasie on Don Giovanni (Cyprien Katsaris, Klavier, SONY SK 52551)
- Apotheose & Fantasies on French Operas (Mark Viner, Piano Classics, PCL10178)
- Opera Fantasies (Viner, Piano Classics, PCL0092)

== Sources ==
- Article "Thalberg" in The New Musical Grove.
- Article "Thalberg" in: Die Musik in Geschichte und Gegenwart.
- Article "Thalberg" in: Fétis, François-Joseph: Biographie universelle des musiciens.
- Articles "Dietrichstein" and "Thalberg" in: Wurzbach, Constantin von: Biographisches Lexikon des Kaiserthums Österreich, Vols. 3 and 44, Vienna 1858 and 1882.
- Correspondance de Frédéric Chopin, * L'aube 1816–1831; ** L'ascension 1831–1840; *** La gloire 1840–1849; Recueillie, révisée, annotée et traduite par Bronislas Éduard Sydow en collaboration avec Suzanne et Denise Chainaye, Paris 1953–1960.
- Apponyi, Rodolphe: Vingt-cinq ans a Paris (1826–1850), Journal du Comte Rodolphe Apponyi, Attaché de l'ambassade d'Autriche a Paris, Publié par Ernest Daudet, * (1826–1830), Cinquième édition; ** (1831–1834); *** (1835–1843), Paris 1913–1914.
- Belance-Zank, Isabelle: The "Three-Hand" Texture: Origins and Use, in: Journal of the American Liszt-Society 38, 1995, p. 99–121.
- Bertoglio, Chiara: Instructive Editions and Piano Performance Practice: A Case Study. Saarbrücken: Lambert Academic Publishing. ISBN 978-3-8473-2151-4
- Bülow, Hans von: Briefe, ed. Marie von Bülow, II. Band, zweite Auflage, Leipzig 1899.
- d'Agoult, Marie (Daniel Stern): Mémoires, Souvenirs et Journaux I/II, Présentation et Notes de Charles F. Dupêchez, Mercure de France 1990.
- Dunkl, Johann Nepomuk: Aus den Erinnerungen eines Musikers, Wien 1876.
- Göllerich, August: Franz Liszt, Berlin 1908.
- Gooley, Dana Andrew: The Virtuoso Liszt, Cambridge University Press 2004.
- Hanslick, Eduard: Geschichte des Concertwesens in Wien, Wien 1869.
- Hominick, Ian Glenn: Sigismund Thalberg (1812–1871), Forgotten Piano Virtuoso: His Career and Musical Contributions, Ohio State Univ. 1991, DMA Diss.
- Horsley, Charles Edward: Reminiscences of Mendelssohn, in: Dwight's Journal of Music XXXII (1871/72), No. 19-21.
- Joubert, Solange: Une correspondance romantique, Madame d'Agoult, Liszt, Lehmann, Paris 1947.
- Kohlenegg, L. R. v. (Poly Henrion): "Unter berühmten Menschen, Eine Mutter im Kampf und drei Genies im Bette," in: Ueber Land und Meer, 25 (1871), p. 18f.
- Legány, Desö: Franz Liszt, Unbekannte Presse und Briefe aus Wien, 1822–1886, Wien Graz 1984.
- Legouvé, Ernest: Liszt et Thalberg, une lettre de Liszt, in: Le Ménestrel of May 11, 1890, p. 145ff.
- Liszt, Franz: Briefe, Vol. VIII, ed. La Mara, Leipzig 1905.
- Liszt, Franz: Briefwechsel mit seiner Mutter, ed. Klara Hamburger, Eisenstadt 2000a.
- Liszt, Franz: Sämtliche Schriften, ed. Detlef Altenburg, Vol. 1: Frühe Schriften, ed. Rainer Kleinertz, commented with collaboration of Serge Gut, Wiesbaden 2000b.
- Liszt, Franz, and d'Agoult, Marie: Correspondance, ed. Daniel Ollivier, Vol. 1: 1833–1840, Paris 1933, Vol. II: 1840–1864, Paris 1934.
- Lott, R. Allen: From Paris to Peoria, How European Piano Virtuosos brought Classical Music to the American Heartland, Oxford 2003.
- Mendelssohn, Fanny and Felix: Briefwechsel 1821 bis 1846, ed. Eva Weisweiler, Berlin 1997.
- Mendelssohn Bartholdy, Felix: Briefe, ed. Rudolf Elvers, Frankfurt 1984.
- Mendelssohn Bartholdy, Felix: Briefe an Ignaz und Charlotte Moscheles, ed. Felix Moscheles, Leipzig 1888.
- Mühsam, Gerd: Sigismund Thalberg als Klavierkomponist, Wien 1937, Phil. Diss.
- Ollivier, Daniel: Autour de Mme d'Agoult et de Liszt, Paris 1941.
- Protzies, Günther: Studien zur Biographie Franz Liszts und zu ausgewählten seiner Klavierwerke in der Zeit der Jahre 1828–1846, Bochum 2004, Phil. Diss.
- Schumann, Clara und Robert: Briefwechsel, Kritische Gesamtausgabe, ed. Eva Weissweiler, Vol. I, 1832–1838, Vol. II, 1839, Basel Frankfurt a. M. 1984, 1987.
- Schumann, Robert: Tagebücher, Vol. I, ed. Georg Eismann, Vol. II ed. Gerd Nauhaus, Leipzig 1971, 1987.
- Suttoni, Charles: Piano and Opera: A Study of the Piano Fantasias Written on Opera Themes in the Romantic Era, New York 1973.
- Thayer, Alexander Wheelock: Ludwig van Beethovens Leben, auf Grund der hinterlassenen Vorarbeiten und Materialien weitergeführt von Hermann Deiters, edited by Hugo Riemann, Fünfter Band, Leipzig 1908.
- Vier, Jaques: L'artiste – le clerc: Documents inédits, Paris 1950.
- Vitale, Vincenzo: "Sigismondo Thalberg in Posillipo," in: Nouve rivista musicale italiana 6, 1972, p. 503–511.
- Walker, Alan: Franz Liszt, Volume 1, The Virtuoso Years 1811–1847, Revised Edition, New York 1987.
- Wieck, Clara: Jugendtagebücher 1827–1840, ed. Gerd Nauhaus and Nancy B. Reich, Wiesbaden etc. Breitkopf & Härtel.
