= Fritz Reuter (composer) =

German musicologist, music educator, composer and Kapellmeister

Fritz Reuter (9 September 1896 – 4 July 1963) was a German musicologist, music educator, composer and Kapellmeister. Reuter was one of the most important German music educators of the 20th century. After studying music and musicology in Dresden and Leipzig, with Teichmüller, Riemann, Schering and Abert, he received his doctorate in 1922 (Dr. phil.). In 1945, he was appointed Kapellmeister at the Volksoper in Dresden. In 1949, he was appointed as the first professor of music education at a German university (University of Halle). He was also director of institutes at the Martin Luther University of Halle-Wittenberg and the Humboldt University Berlin. In 1955, he was one of the initiators of the first Hallische Musiktage.

== Life ==
=== Origin and music studies ===
Born in Löbtau, now part of Dresden, Reuter came from a Saxon artisan family from the Ore Mountains. He was born as the son of the master builder and carpenter Friedrich August Reuter (born 1868) in a working-class suburb. His father worked his way up to become the owner of a construction business. Reuter's mother Johanna, née Noack (born 1878), had Sorbs Roots and was the driving force in his musical education. He received piano lessons from Max Stranssky and Richard Schmidt, both teachers at the Hochschule für Musik Carl Maria von Weber Dresden, as well as theory lessons from Paul Walde. Schmidt also introduced him to Baroque music by Johann Sebastian Bach, which Reuter learned to love. He passed an exam in 1912 and later taught music theory and piano himself at the "Dresdner Lehranstalt für Musik", founded by Walde in 1914. Reuter came into early contact with the music pedagogy of the Dresden music school director Richard Kaden – his spiritus rector – which stood in a line of tradition with the approaches of the philosopher Karl Christian Friedrich Krause.

Reuter first attended the Bürgerschule, and in 1916 he passed the Abitur at the Annenrealgymnasium in Dresden. During the First World War (1916/17) he was trained as an infantryman (grenadier) in Dresden, but was not called up for military service. Unwilling to take over his father's business, he broke with his parental home and began studying music instead. He financed this through two "Riemann scholarships", which he received for the best annual musicological works, as well as interrupting his studies as a répétiteur at the famous Dresden circus Sarrasani (1917) and as a theatre conductor in Allenstein/East Prussia. At the same time, Reuter studied in Leipzig at the University of Music and Theatre Leipzig and at the University of Music and Theatre Leipzig. His teachers included among others Otto Weinreich and Robert Teichmüller in piano, Stephan Krehl in composition and Bernhard Porst in bandmaster training, as well as Hugo Riemann, Hermann Abert and Arnold Schering in musicology. He also studied German with Albert Köster and Eduard Sievers and philosophy and pedagogy with Eduard Spranger, Theodor Litt, Johannes Volkelt and Hans Driesch.

In 1922, he was awarded a Dr. phil. from the University of Leipzig for his dissertation Die Geschichte der deutschen Oper in Leipzig am Ende des 17. und am Anfang des 18. Jahrhunderts (1693–1720). The referees for the thesis were Hermann Abert and Rudolf Kötzschke.

=== Lecturer in Leipzig ===
As a sideline, Reuter initially also worked as a music critic for the Leipziger Musik- und Theater-Zeitung, which appeared in 1921. Because of his activity as a composer, he became a teacher of music theory at the Royal or State Conservatory of Music in Leipzig in 1921. There, on Riemann's recommendation, he introduced the basso continuo into theory teaching. He also devoted himself to the psychological foundation of ear training. In addition, from 1922 he was active at the Kirchenmusikalisches Institut of the Leipzig Conservatory, where he taught ecclesiastical composition and music theory as well as the history of church music. In addition, in 1924/25 he took on a teaching position for the pedagogy of school music at the University of Leipzig. From 1932 he also taught music history. As a result of a report by Reuter in the 1920s, the Sächsischer Landtag introduced the school subject "music" at Volksschules and higher schools. In 1925, moreover, he became a member of the examination board for the musical state examination at the University of Leipzig. In addition to his university lectureship, Reuter passed the state examination for the higher teaching profession in the subjects of music and German in 1931.

In particular, due to his Daghestanian Suite for Orchestra (1927), composed for the Autonomous Soviet Socialist Republic of Dagestan, and his conducting of Leipzig Arbeitergesangverein (Michaelsche Chöre), he lost his teaching positions after the Machtergreifung by the Nazis in 1933. He also maintained contacts with Jewish musicians (et al. Alfred Szendrei of the Leipzig Symphony Orchestra, whose Dirigierkunde he was to publish in 1956) and social democratic politicians. His works were banned from performance and the Reichs-Rundfunk-Gesellschaft cancelled current contracts with Reuter. Szendrei, who gave the world premieres of his Cello Concerto (1929 together with the cello virtuoso Fritz Schertel at the Mitteldeutsche Rundfunk AG) and his cantata Huttens letzte Tage (1930 together with the baritone Karl Kamann) had been responsible for, attested to the composer's "strong talent" in his autobiographical notes in 1970. Reuter and Szendrei became friends and – interrupted by the Second World War – maintained correspondence.

=== Saxon school service ===
To make a living and because he wanted to resume his profession, he accommodated himself to those in power and, with effect from 1 May 1933 he joined the National Socialist German Workers' Party member number 2.429.811) relatively early. In 1934, he additionally became a member of the party organisations Nationalsozialistische Volkswohlfahrt and in the Nationalsozialistischer Lehrerbund.

After the stations as Lehramtsreferendariat and assessor he became Studienrat for music and German at the Rudolf-Hildebrand-Schule Markkleeberg in Leipzig-Connewitz in 1934. There he built up a pupils' wind orchestra. In 1937, he moved to the Sächsisches Staatsministerium für Kultus in Dresden and was given the "supervision of school music affairs" in the Gau Saxony. In 1944, he was promoted to Oberstudienrat. Until 1945, he taught at a secondary school in Dresden-Plauen.

The music historian Fred K. Prieberg (2009) classified individual statements in older articles on Reuter as "pseudohistory". For example, he had held no "prominent offices" before 1933 – apart from his teaching duties – and then made a career in the teaching profession in the Third Reich. On the other hand, in the 1940s, Reuter proposed to succeed Günther Ramin (Thomaskantor) as artistic director of the Gymnasium Leipzig, which had been founded by the National Socialists in 1941.

=== Professor in Halle and Berlin ===
After the Second World War in 1945, he was initially dismissed from the teaching profession. He became a member of the Free German Trade Union Federation and was engaged by the Soviet occupation forces as dramaturge and Kapellmeister at the Volksoper in Dresden-Gittersee, the later Landesbühnen Sachsen. In 1946, his denazification took place, so he was able to prove, among other things, that he had supported a Jewish woman and had been under surveillance by the Gestapo. According to his student Günther Noll (1997), he maintained contact "with his Jewish friends and helped them to escape, despite the existential dangers involved, also hiding them at his home".

In 1949, he was appointed professor with a teaching assignment by the Landesregierung von Sachsen-Anhalt at the request of the Faculty of Education of Martin Luther University of Halle-Wittenberg. Unlike other former NSDAP members of the faculty, he did not become a member of a block party in the GDR. In addition, Reuter taught music theory and composition at the Staatliche Hochschule für Theater und Musik Halle from 1950. In 1952, he was appointed professor with chair at the University of Halle. Furthermore, he presided over the Institute for Music Education there as founding director from 1949 to 1955. In Halle, Reuter established a year-long specialist course for music teachers who had served in the war and could thus catch up on their specialist qualifications.

From 1955 until his Soviet-critical departure in 1962 he headed the Institute for Music Education at the Faculty of Education of the Humboldt University of Berlin. There he campaigned for the construction of a new concert hall. Reuter's successor in Berlin was his student Werner Busch.

From 1951 until he was replaced by Walther Siegmund-Schultze in 1955, Reuter was the first chairman of the Halle-Magdeburg district association of the Verband der Komponisten und Musikwissenschaftler der DDR. Alongside Walter Draeger, Gerhard Wohlgemuth and others, he was one of the initiators of the 1st Hallische Musiktage, held in 1955, as a board member of the Halle Working Group. It was also he who, in October 1954, had for the first time "concretised" the previously "raised idea of such music days.

In the GDR, Reuter worked for a time as head of department and chairman of the Scientific Advisory Council for Music Education at the Ministry of Higher and Technical Education (East Germany) as well as a member of the Scientific Council at the Ministerium für Volksbildung (DDR). Ultimately, it is thanks to him that music education became a university discipline.

=== Family and estate ===
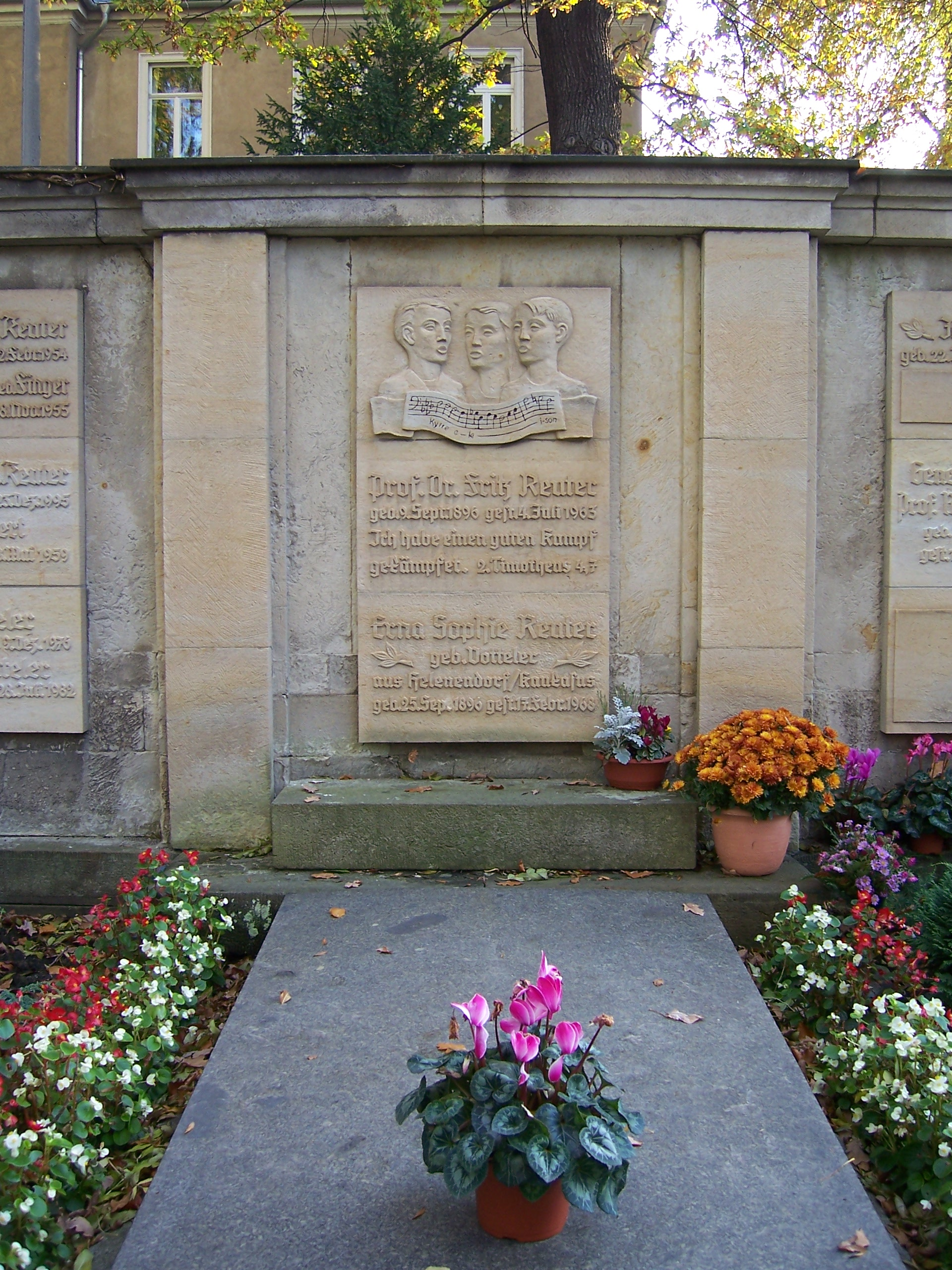
Grave of Fritz and Erna Sophie Reuter at the Inner Plauen Cemetery in Dresden (2008)

Fritz Reuter was of Lutheran denomination and was considered "deeply religious". He had been married to the singer since 1924 Erna Sophie, née Votteler (1896–1968), married and father of four children; his son Rolf Reuter (1926–2007) became a conductor. A year after his retirement, he died in 1963 in Dresden and was buried in the Protestant Innerer Plauenscher Friedhof in Dresden-Plauen.

His estate (about nine metres of shelves) with autographs, letters among others is in the music department of the Staatsbibliothek zu Berlin – Preußischer Kulturbesitz. On the 25th anniversary of Reuter's death (1988), a small exhibition on his person was opened at the same place.

Further documents are located among others in the Saxon State and University Library Dresden, the Landesbibliothek Mecklenburg-Vorpommern Günther Uecker in Schwerin, the university library of the Hochschule für Musik und Theater "Felix Mendelssohn Bartholdy" Leipzig, the Monacensia of the Münchner Stadtbibliothek and the Stadtbibliothek Trier as well as the Steven Swanson Collection in Frisco, Texas. A correspondence with his West Berlin colleague Hermann Grabner (former Leipzig Universitätsmusikdirektor) from 1951/52 was published in the Wissenschaftliche Zeitschrift der Humboldt-Universität zu Berlin. Gesellschafts- und sprachwissenschaftliche Reihe.

== Work ==
In the 1920s, Reuter was politicised by the German Youth Movement, whereby he tended to belong to the "left-wing" current. Under National Socialism and later under Socialism, he adapted both as a composer and as a scientist. According to Ludwig Holtmeier (2005), he "served the politically correct genres" in any case, experimenting with various cantatas as early as the late 1920s. His wide-ranging compositional œuvre (Heinz Wegener compiled a catalogue of works for the Gedenkschrift Fritz Reuter in 1966) amounts to ca. 300 works, some of which were destroyed during the war. He composed vocal music (among others a Volksoratorium, seven cantatas, a mass, solo Lieder), stage music (among others four operas, two melodramas) and instrumental music (among others three symphonies, one concerto each for cello, violin and organ, several orchestral suites, piano and organ music). Reuter's compositional path was marked "from a late romantic-expressionist beginning to melodic-sentence conciseness on the basis of polyphonic voice leading", as Dieter Härtwig (2005) noted. According to Gilbert Stöck (2008), in the GDR Reuter "sometimes distanced himself critically from some dogmas of Socialist Realism" and pursued a neo-Romantic style. Noll attested that the composer certainly had a penchant for "progressive stylistics". Thus he was among others featured in concerts of the "New Music Section" of the Dresden chapter of the Cultural Association of the GDR (1949) and the Hallische Musiktage (1955) played. He had his first major success with the cantata Der Struwwelpeter (1930). On a text by Ernst Wiechert, he created the oratorio Das Spiel vom deutschen Bettelmann around 1934. Prieberg addressed problematic compositions by Reuter during the National Socialist era, such as the Sudetendeutsche Suite (1939), published by the Reichsverband für Volksmusik, whose title celebrated the cession of the Sudetenland. Furthermore, individual works such as Der Mütter Kreis (1935) were performed at relevant cultural events, such as the NS-Frauenschaft and the Militant League for German Culture. In 1937, he was presented alongside other Saxon composers at the "Gaukulturwoche" Saxony in Bautzen under Reichskulturkammer president Peter Raabe. Between 1945 and 1949, several stage works were written among others the new arrangements of Pergolesi's Intermezzo La serva padrona (1947) from 1733 and the ballet Henrikje (1947) by Inka Unverzagt. In 1948, the comic opera Ein Funken Liebe (c. 1940) was premiered at the Dresden Volksoper. Considered highly developed is its Weimarhalle reception (1948/49) of Goethe's Singspiel Jest, Cunning and Revenge, Reuter's music was also performed in the GDR by the concert orchestra of his hometown, the Dresden Philharmonic.

Reuter was a renowned music theorist. Following the efforts of Salomon Jadassohn in the late 19th century, his Methodik des musiktheoretischen Unterrichts, published in 1929, was groundbreaking. As early as 1926, he drew attention to the alienation of composition theory and music theory. From this he concluded that music theory had to become more scientific and pedagogical. Like his friend and colleague Sigfrid Karg-Elert, he advocated a polaristic and functional harmony. Thus, Reuter's textbook Practical Harmonics of the 20th Century (1952) was directly based on his Polaristic Theory of Sound and Tonality. Magret Hager (2005) called Reuter's work a "manifesto of polarism" His efforts in the GDR drew a scholarly discourse in the journal Musik und Gesellschaft, in which Siegfried Bimberg, Christoph Hohlfeld and Johannes Piersig also participated. The dispute culminated in conflict with Georg Knepler of the Hochschule für Musik "Hanns Eisler", who saw in Reuter a contradiction to dialectical materialism. In the end, Hermann Grabner's monistic theory of function, which had its origins with Riemann, prevailed due to factual considerations.

Holtmeier described him as one of the "founding fathers" of music education in Germany. After Walter Clemens and Werner Busch, he "acquired an international reputation" in the field. Already in the Weimar Republic he gave the first music pedagogical impulses, especially alongside Walter Kühn and Georg Schünemann. Early on, Reuter rendered outstanding services to the "scientific foundation" of music education. Reuter published, among other things. In 1926, he published an elementary work on music teacher training (Musikpädagogik in Grundzügen). In 1929, his name appeared in Hugo Riemanns Musik-Lexikon. Like Richard Wicke, he then attained an exposed position in music education in the GDR. Wilfried Gruhn (1993) called him the Nestor of GDR music education A 1973 GDR dissertation saw him as a pathfinder for a socialist school music education In the 1950s he called for the inclusion of empirical social research in the discipline. Already in the 1930s, he developed a distaste for musical modernity, especially Neue Musik. Reuter saw the traditional use of tonality and consonance as the standard for music education. Similar to Theodor W. Adorno, he also rejected light music and jazz. Reuter argued with Plato's Ethos doctrine. According to Gerd Rienäcker (2010), he belonged, along with Hans-Georg Görner, Georg Trexler and Wilhelm Weismann, to a circle "that discredited contemporary music-making in the GDR through conservatism of various stripes".

== Compositions ==
He composed the operas Ein Funken Liebe (1948) and Scherz, List und Rache (1949); the melodrama Der Hase und der Igel (1961); the cantata Arbeit ist Leben (1960) and other choral works; 3 symphonies; chamber music; songs.

== Students ==
During his time as a university lecturer he supervised 19 dissertations (among them: Siegfried Bimberg, Hella Brock, Walter Clemens, Werner Felix, Hans John, Rolf Lukowsky, Günther Müller, Günther Noll, Johannes Georg Pahn) and four habilitation theses (Siegfried Bimberg, Hella Brock, Werner Busch and Rolf Lukowsky).

Among his pupils, including conductors and composers, were his son Rolf Reuter furthermore Heinz Roy and Manfred Schubert in Berlin, Günter Bust, Günter Fleischhauer, Horst Irrgang, Erhard Ragwitz, Gerhard Wohlgemuth and Carlferdinand Zech in Halle an der Saale and Benno Ammann, Herbert Collum, Musja Gottlieb, Hans Heintze, Franz Konwitschny, Lars-Erik Larsson, Werner Neumann, Assen Najdenow, Otto Riemer, Peter Schacht and Georg Trexler in Leipzig.

== Honours and awards ==
- 1955 Musikpreis für Komposition der Stadt Halle for his Concerto for Violin and Orchestra (1953) — The Cologne musicologist Paul Mies (1965) noted in an analysis: 'The work [Violin Concerto] shows Reuter's artistry in the most beautiful light; it is masterful'.
- 1961 Vaterländischer Verdienstorden in Silber der DDR — On the occasion of his 65th birthday (1961), a Festschrift was presented to him by his pupil Siegfried Bimberg. The celebrations in the new music hall of the Humboldt University of Berlin were attended by the Rector Kurt Schröder, the Dean of the Faculty of Education Kurt Haspas and the Deputy Minister of Culture Hans Pischner took part. In addition, Reuter received the Patriotic Order of Merit in Silver from the State Council of East Germany for his cultural-political services.

At the Humboldt University in Berlin, the Fritz-Reuter-Saal in the Dorotheenstraße 24 was named after the music teacher. In 1958, a Schuke organ was installed in it. Posthumously, a commemorative concert was dedicated to him at the Konzerthaus on his 100th birthday.

== Publications ==
Publisher

- Klavierübung. 2 Teile in einem Heft, Mitteldeutscher Verlag, Halle 1951.
- Alte Programm-Musik für Klavier. Mitteldeutscher Verlag, Halle 1951.
- Dirigierkunde (by Alfred Szendrei). 3. revised edition, VEB Breitkopf & Härtel, Leipzig 1956.

Books

- Das musikalische Hören auf psychologischer Grundlage. C. F. Kahnt, Leipzig 1925; 2nd edition 1942.
- Musikpädagogik in Grundzügen. Quelle & Meyer, Leipzig 1926.
- Zur Methodik der Gehörübungen und des Musikdiktats. C. F. Kahnt, Leipzig 1927.
- Praktische Gehörbildung auf Grundlage der Tonika-Do-Lehre. C. F. Kahnt, Leipzig 1928.
- Harmonieaufgaben nach dem System Sigfrid Karg-Elerts. C. F. Kahnt, Leipzig 1928.
- Die Beantwortung des Fugenthemas. Dargestellt an den Themen von Bachs Wohltemperiertem Klavier. C. F. Kahnt, Leipzig 1929.
- Methodik des musiktheoretischen Unterrichts auf neuzeitlichen Grundlagen. E. Klett, Stuttgart 1929; Mitteldeutscher Verlag, Halle 1950; 2nd edition 1950.
- Der Kuckuck und der Esel. Kinderlieder – Bilderbuch – Klavierschule. Drawings by Erich Weber-Links, Compiler: Kurt Herzog. Junne, Main among others 1947.
- Praktisches Partitur-Spielen. Mitteldeutscher Verlag, Halle/Saale 1951; 2nd edition, VEB Hofmeister, Leipzig 1954.
- Praktisches Generalbass-Spielen. Mitteldeutscher Verlag, Halle/Saale 1951; 2nd edition, VEB Hofmeister, Leipzig 1955.
- Praktische Harmonik des 20. Jahrhunderts. Konsonanz- und Dissonanzlehre nach dem System von Sigfrid Karg-Elert mit Aufgaben. Mitteldeutscher Verlag, Halle 1951.
- Grundlagen der Musikerziehung. VEB Breitkopf & Härtel, Leipzig 1962; Bulgarian translation 1968.

== Recording ==
- Sonate für Violine und Klavier (Lausitzer Sonate) / Phantastische Suite für Flöte und Klavier op. 6 / Der Hase und Der Igel (Eterna/Nova, 1965) with Rolf Reuter, Barbara Reuter-Rau, Heinz Fügner, Ursula Wendler-Reuter and the Gewandhausorchester Leipzig – 1963 und 1964 recordings
