= Manfred Schubert (composer) =

German composer and conductor

Manfred Schubert (27 April 1937 – 10 June 2011) was a German composer, conductor and music critic.

== Life ==
Schubert was born the son of a lawyer in Berlin-Charlottenburg. In his youth, he received violin and piano lessons; he passed his Abitur in Berlin-Köpenick. From 1955 to 1960, he studied music education with Fritz Reuter, Georg Knepler and Siegfried Bimberg and Slavic studies at the Humboldt-Universität zu Berlin. Von 1960 bis 1963 war er Meisterschüler for musical composition with Rudolf Wagner-Régeny at the Academy of Arts, Berlin. From 1962 to 1990, he worked regularly as a music critic for the Berliner Zeitung, after that only sporadically. In 1978, he conducted the Staatskapelle Berlin at a guest concert in Lyon. From 1984 to 1985, he worked as a lecturer in composition and instrumentation at the Hochschule für Musik "Hanns Eisler". Since 1963, he lived in Berlin as a freelance composer.

Schubert died in Berlin at the age of 74. His estate is owned by the Berlin State Library.

== Work ==
=== Compositions ===
==== Orchestral works ====
- 1965: Tanzstudien, for small orchestra (15')
- 1966: Orchestermusik 66 (Paean) (7')
- 1966: Suite für Orchester (22')
- 1970: Divertimento für Orchester (14')
- 1971: Konzert für Klarinette und Orchester (22')
- 1972: Hommage à Rudolf Wagner-Régeny, Concertante meditations for harp solo, 13 string instruments, percussion and celesta (20')
- 1974: Cantilena e Capriccio, per violino ed orchestra (16')
- 1979–82: I. Sinfonie, for large orchestra (32')
- 1988: Konzert für zwei Violinen und Orchester (25')
- 1990: Vogelreden III, Capriccio für 6 Flöten (1 Spieler) und Streichorchester (22')
- 1998–05: Ein ökumenisches Te Deum, for four solo voices, speaker, eight-part mixed choir, organ and large orchestra (75')

==== Chamber music ====
- 1961: Musik für sieben Instrumente (12')
- 1963: I. Streichquartett (16')
- 1966: Sonata per flauto solo (15')
- 1967: Moments musicaux, for wind quintet (12')
- 1967: Septett (11')
- 1967/68: Nachtstück und Passacaglia, for octet (17')
- 1970: II. Streichquartett (14')
- 1975: Evocazione, per undici esecutori (10')
- 1984/85: Vogelreden II, Concertante Duo for Flute and Harp (12')
- 1987: Elegia con elgeganza, Canto aleatorio V per contrabbasso solo (9')
- 1987: Ramificazioni, Canto aleatorio VI per arpa sola (9')
- 2002: Trazóm Suédama, Trio for oboe, violin and violoncello (18')

==== Piano pieces ====
- 1960: Variazioni per pianoforte (11')
- 1961: I. Klaviersonate (10')
- 1963: II. Klaviersonate (11')
- 1967: Serenata semplice (3')
- 1969: Vier Cembalostücke (7')
- 1976: Esde Hafis, Canto aleatorio II per pianoforte solo (7')

==== Vocal music ====
- 1964: Acht Lieder, on poems by Bertolt Brecht (9')
- 1964: Traumwald, Four Lieder on poems by Christian Morgenstern for baritone and String Orchestra (6')
- 1973: Canzone amorose, Concerto for baritone and large orchestra on poems by Johannes Bobrowski (22')
- 1986: Nachtgesänge, after Carl Friedrich Zelter together with two intermezzi for medium voice and small orchestra (Goethe) (20')
- 1992: Miserere, for eight–part mixed choir and organ (8')
- 1996: Misericordia ejus, antiphon for 2 mixed choirs a cappella (12')
- 1995–97: Missa viadrina, for eight–part mixed choir a cappella (50')
- 2006: Zweite Romantik, seven sonnets for medium voice and piano (32')

=== Poetry collections ===
- 1997–2009: Blaues Haus auf rotem Grund; Reisegedichte
- 1998–2006: Muse und Metier; Künstlerprobleme
- 1993–2009: Wetterleuchten; Gedichte zwischen Hoffnung und Zweifel

== Prizes ==
- Composition Prize at the Prague Spring International Music Festival (1966)
- Ernst-Zinna-Preis der Stadt Berlin (1966)
- Prize of the Verband der Komponisten und Musikwissenschaftler der DDR (1966, 1969)
- Hanns Eisler Prize of the Rundfunk der DDR (1977)
- Recognition by the International Rostrum of Composers of the UNESCO in Paris (1984)
