= Szendrei =

Szendrei is a Hungarian surname. Notable people with the name include:

- Ágnes Szendrei, Hungarian-American mathematician
- Alfred Szendrei (1884–1976), American musician and musicologist, husband of Eugenie
- Eugenie Szendrei (1884–1955), Austrian-Hungarian-American opera singer, wife of Alfred
- József Szendrei (born 1954), Hungarian footballer
- Mária Szendrei, head of Algebra and Number Theory at the János Bolyai Mathematical Institute
- Norbert Szendrei (born 2000), Hungarian footballer
- Sándor Szendrei, record-holder in the Budapest Marathon
- Tibor Szendrei, founder of Hungarian newspaper Budapest Week
