= Siegfried Borris =

German composer, musicologist and music educator (1906–1987)

- Borris in 1960
- Born: Siegfried Jakob Boris Zuckermann; 4 November 1906; Berlin, German Empire
- Died: 23 August 1987 (aged 80); Berlin, Germany
- Education: Humboldt University of Berlin; Musikhochschule Berlin
- Occupations: Composer; Academic teacher; Music manager
- Organizations: Musikhochschule Berlin; Institut für Neue Musik und Musikerziehung; Deutscher Tonkünstlerverband; Deutscher Musikrat
- Awards: Order of Merit of the Federal Republic of Germany; Ernst-Reuter-Plakette
- Website: www.siegfriedborris.de

Siegfried Borris (Note: Siegfried Borris became his legal name in 1951.) (born Siegfried Jakob Boris Zuckermann; 4 November 1906 – 23 August 1987) was a German composer, musicologist and music educator. He became a lecturer at the Musikhochschule Berlin in 1929, but his career was interrupted during the Nazi regime. He was appointed professor in 1945 and became an influential pedagogue, composer of music for young players, and active in music organisations. He was president of national associations, of Deutscher Tonkünstlerverband from 1963 to 1972, and of Deutscher Musikrat from 1971 to 1976.

== Life ==
Siegfried Jakob Boris Zuckermann was born in Berlin on 4 November 1906, the son of the economist Salomo Zuckermann and his wife Martha, a teacher. His father was Jewish and had converted to Christianity when he married in 1905.

He initially studied national economics at the Humboldt University of Berlin as his father wished, but also studied music at the same time. In 1927, he was accepted in Paul Hindemith's composition class. From 1929, he additionally studied musicology. He obtained a doctorate in 1933, supervised by Arnold Schering. His dissertation was Kirnbergers Leben und Werk und seine Bedeutung im Berliner Musikkreis um 1750, about the life and influence of Johann Kirnberger.

As early as 1929, he worked as a lecturer at the Musikhochschule in Berlin. He was dismissed in 1933, at the instigation of the Kampfbund für deutsche Kultur under the Nazi regime. He then taught music privately. When the Nuremberg Laws of 1935 were enacted, he also lost his German citizenship which had been granted to him in 1925. He subsequently remained in statelessness until 1950.

After World War II, Borris returned to the Musikhochschule in Berlin, where he was appointed professor. He established and directed a teachers' seminary. He was made an emeritus in 1972. His focus was on topics such as school music, young musicians and the popularisation of contemporary classical music. He composed operas for schools and fairy-tale operas, and produced radio programs of new music. He became a member of the advisory board of the broadcaster Sender Freies Berlin. Borris was chairman of the new Institut für Neue Musik und Musikerziehung in Darmstadt from 1961 to 1972, also president of Verband Deutscher Musikerzieher und konzertierender Künstler, an association of German music educators and performers from 1963 to 1972, and in a leading position in the Arbeitsgemeinschaft Musikerziehung und Musikpflege. He was a member of the Deutscher Musikrat from 1964, serving as its president from 1971 to 1976.

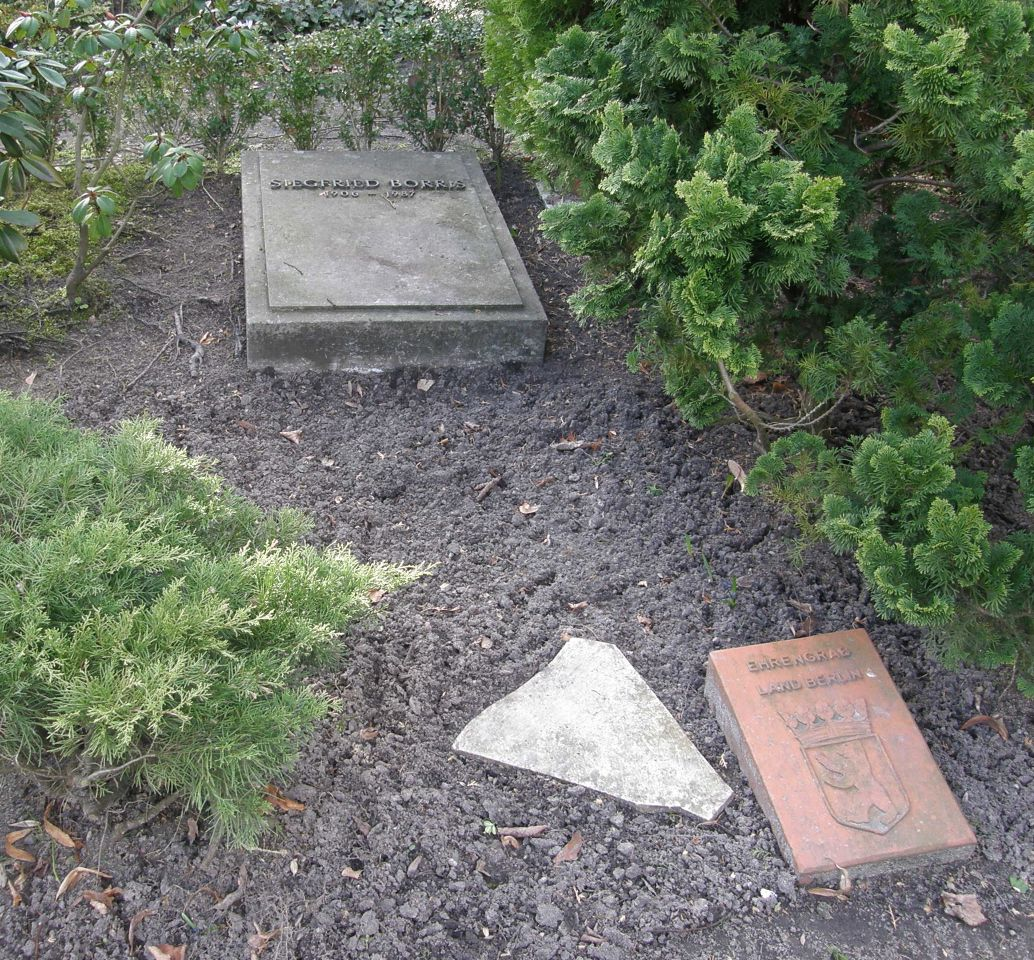
Honorary grave of Siegfried Borris at the Dahlem Cemetery

Borris died in Berlin at the age of 80. He was buried in the Dahlem Cemetery. His grave was designated as a grave of honour in Berlin until 2014.

== Honours ==
- 1972: Officer's Cross of the Order of Merit of the Federal Republic of Germany
- 1981: Ernst-Reuter-Plakette of Berlin.
- 1986: Commander's Cross of the Order of Merit of the Federal Republic of Germany

== Publications ==
As a composer, Borris wrote five symphonies, suites and divertimento, a harpsichord concerto and a flute concerto, pieces for organ, and cantatas. Borris also wrote several works for mandolin orchestra. The main focus of his compositional work was in the field of youth opera and Spielmusik, music used in musical education. Borris also published numerous writings on music theory. His works and personal documents are held by the Academy of Arts, Berlin.

=== Operas ===
- Hans im Glück, radio opera, Op. 40, Berlin: S. Borris, 1947
- Hirotas und Gerlinde, radio opera, Op. 41, Wilhelmshaven: Heinrichshofen's, 1946
- Die Rübe, a cheerful fairy tale opera (after Grimm), Op. 56, Berlin: Sirius 1955
- Ruf des Lebens, scenic cantata, Op. 72, Berlin: Sirius, 1954

=== Orchestral music ===
- Concertino for Flute and String Orchestra, Op. 71, Berlin: Sirius, [ca. 1950]
- Divertimento, Op. 31.3 for strings and five wind players, Wilhelmshaven: Heinrichshofen's
- Symphony No. 1 in B minor, Op. 19 for orchestra, Berlin: Sirius, 1952
- Symphony No. 2 in E-flat major, Op. 21
- Symphony No. 3 in A major, Op. 29
- Symphony No. 4 in E major, Op. 60
- Symphony No. 5 in C-sharp minor, Op. 61
- Frühlingsgesellen Op. 49
- Orchestersuite, Op. 25
- Concertino for Englisch horn and string orchestra, Op. 48, 1949
- Intrada for orchestra, Op. 57
- Ländliche Suite – Spielmusik zum "Bruder Singer" for three wind instruments and string, 1954
- Concerto for viola da gamba, three woodwinds and string orchestra, Op. 87
- Concerto for organ and small orchestra, Op. 110
- Concerto for Orchestra in one movement, Op. 112
- Concerto for soprano saxophone and orchestra, Op. 120, 1966

=== Chamber music ===
- Partita for viola and cello, Op. 4, 1928, Berlin: Merkantil- und Musikalien-Druckerei Hannes Helm, between 1939 und 1944, or Berlin: S. Borris, 1947
- Quartet for flute, violin, viola and cello, Op. 17 No. 2, Berlin: Sirius-Verlag, 1952
- Wind Quintet, Op. 25 No. 2, Berlin: Sirius, 1946
- Partita for flute, Op. 27 No. 1, Halle (Saale): Mitteldeutscher Verlag, 1951
- Partita for two violins, Op. 27 No. 2, Leipzig: Friedrich Hofmeister, 1959
- Sonata for piano in B minor, Op. 21, 1940
- Sonata for flute and piano, Op. 22 No. 2, 1942, Berlin: Sirius, 1948
- 3 Kleine Suiten (3 Little Suites) for piano, Op. 31, 1942, 1949–1950
- Sonata in F for viola and piano, Op. 51 (published 1950)
- Villanellen for flute, violin and cello, Op. 97
- Canzona for viola and organ (or harpsichord), Op. 110
- Kleine Suite (Little Suite) for viola and piano

=== Vocal music ===
- Fahrtenkantate Op. 54, 2, for mixed choir a cappella, version for mixed choir, instruments ad libitum (3 winds, string quintet), Berlin: Sirius, [1950]
- Frühlingsgesellen Op. 49, "A song play", Berlin: Sirius, 1950
- Missa "Dona nobis pacem" Op. 63 for mixed choir a cappella, Berlin: Sirius, 1955

=== School music ===
- Kleine Lieder für Karen-Isela, Berlin: A. Nauck & Co., 1945
- Das grosse Spielbuch, 4 vols., Leipzig: Peters, [1951–1954]

=== Poem collections ===
- Herbstaufbruch, printed as manuscript, 47 pages, undated
- Der klingende Kreis, printed as manuscript, Berlin 1938
- Weg und Wende, printed as manuscript, 1941

=== Books ===
- Beiträge zu einer neuen Musikkunde 1947/48
- Praktische Harmonielehre, Berlin (1938) 1950/1977
- Einführung in die moderne Musik Halle 1950
- Der Schlüssel zur Musik von heute. Düsseldorf, Wien: Econ-Verlag 1967
- Grundlagen einer musikalischen Umweltkunde. Wolfenbüttel, Zürich: Möseler 1975
- Kulturgut Musik als Massenware. Wiesbaden: Breitkopf & Härtel 1978

== Notes and references ==
Notes
