= Carlferdinand Zech =

German musicologist and composer

Carlferdinand Zech (14 December 1928 – 16 September 1999) was a German musicologist, composer and choir conductor.

== Early life ==
Born in Potsdam, Zech attended Franckesche Stiftungen in Halle an der Saale. From 1939 to 1943, he was a member of the Stadtsingechor zu Halle. Afterwards, he attended secondary school in Schönebeck (Elbe) in 1948, where Hans Naumilkat was his teacher. During this time, he conducted the Volkschor and the school choir of Schönebeck. Zech also composed his first works of music for the stage. From 1950 to 1955, he studied at the Staatliche Hochschule für Theater und Musik Halle, studying under Werner Gößling (conducting), Fritz Reuter (music theory and composition) and Walther Siegmund-Schultze (music history). He completed his studies as Kapellmeister. He also passed the Staatsexamen in conducting and music theory.

== Career ==
From 1955 to 1959, Zech was an assistant at the Institute for Musicology of the Martin Luther University of Halle-Wittenberg. He then directed the Stadtsingechor zu Halle until 1968, which he rebuilt. He installed choir classes and affiliated the choir with Latina August Hermann Francke. From 1951 to 1976, he served as choir director of the Universitätschor Halle "Johann Friedrich Reichardt". From 1968, he taught music theory and music history at the University of Halle-Wittenberg.

In 1972, he was awarded the Dr. phil. with this dissertation Die Solokonzerte von Dmitri Shostakovich. Untersuchungen über Aufbau der Werke und ihre ästhetische Wertung. In 1982 he completed a second disseration: Die kompositorischen Gestaltungsmittel unseres Jahrhunderts als Gegenstand der Musiktheorie.

Zech published several contributions to music theory and emerged as a composer.

Zech died in Halle (Saale) at the age of 78. Since 2013, his estate has been managed by the Universitäts- und Landesbibliothek Sachsen-Anhalt.

== Compositions ==
=== Instrumental music ===
- Kleine Suite für Kammerorchester, 1957
- 2 Sonatinen für Klavier, 1958
- Holzbläser-Quartett, 1959
- Kleine Suite, 1959
- Vier kleine Stücke für Klavier, 1960
- Festliche Musik für Kammerorchester, 1961
- Preludio, 1963
- Leuna II, 1963
- Nonett für Bläser und Schlagwerk, 1966
- Kleine Sinfonie für Jugendorchester, 1968
- Divertimento für Streichorchester, 1970
- Concertante Musik für Kammerorchester, 1971
- Streichquartett, 1977

=== Vocal music ===
- Kantate vom neuen Menschen, 1960
- Festkantate, 1961
- Unser Jahr beginnt im Mai, 1965
- Memlebener Kantate, 1976

== Publications ==
- Johnen, Kurt; Zech, Carlferdinand (1988). Allgemeine Musiklehre (in German). Frankfurt (Main): Suhrkamp. ISBN 978-3-518-37718-5.
- Tonsatzstudien. Funktionsharmonik, Liedbegleitung, Kontrapunkt. Deutscher Verlag für Musik, Leipzig 1988. ISBN 978-3-370-00057-3
- Die kompositorischen Gestaltungsmittel unseres Jahrhunderts als Gegenstand der Musiktheorie (Dissertation 2).
