= Richard Kaden =

German musician and music writer

Richard Ferdinand Kaden (10 February 1856 – 9 July 1923) was a German violinist, violist, music educator, musicologist and composer.

== Life ==
Born in Dresden, Kingdom of Saxony, Kaden came from a Freiberg miner family. In 1856 he was born as one of two sons – Richard's brother became a major – of the ministerial treasurer Moritz Ferdinand Kaden (d. 1921) and his wife Emilie Geyer in the royal Saxon capital and residence city of Dresden. His father, who had initially been a miner himself, then served as a tambour in the Royal Saxon Army. As a soldier he experienced the German revolutions of 1848–1849. On leaving the army, he followed a superior into the management of a private railway company. After nationalisation, he made it to the ministry in Dresden as a sub-civil servant.

Kaden attended the 1st citizen school in his hometown. While still a pupil, he began training at the Königliches Konservatorium Dresden (until 1877). His teachers included among others concertmaster Ferdinand Hüllweck and later Johann Christoph Lauterbach in violin as well as Carl Heinrich Döring in piano, Julius Rietz in theory and composition, Wilhelm Rischbieter in counterpoint and Julius Rühlmann in history of music. At the age of fourteen, he became a violinist in the Buffold Town Band. By the age of fifteen, he was chief second fiddle. After the disbandment of the Stadtkapelle, he was violist of the Sächsische Staatskapelle Dresden from 1872 to 1896. In 1888, he was appointed to the Bayreuth Festival orchestra.

While working as a musician, he became a student at the Königlich Sächsisches Polytechnikum Dresden. There he studied philosophy and education with Fritz Schultze (1846–1908), as well as psychology. He received further inspiration from Paul Theodor Hohlfeld (1840–1910), editor of philosopher Karl Christian Friedrich Krause's writings, and later scientific director of the Pädagogische Musikschule.

From 1872 to 1883, he was engaged as violin and ensemble teacher at the Dresden Conservatory. In 1883 he became artistic director of the private progressive education "Pädagogische Musikschule zu Dresden", which was founded by his pupil and later Vera von Mertschinski and existed until 1931. Among others, Henri Marteau and Karl Panzner were his pupils there. He is also considered the spiritus rector of the music educator Fritz Reuter. Furthermore, he was chairman of the Dresden and 2nd chairman of the Saxon Music School Directors Association. There, among others, together with Hugo Riemann, Julius Klengel and Hermann Vetter, he introduced a Prüfungsordnung (from 1913) for music school teachers.

He wrote essays (Der Kunstwart, the Neue Zeitschrift für Musik, the Musikalisches Wochenblatt among others) on music education and aesthetic topics. With his manuscript School of Music Education (1892) he wanted to create "a scientifically underpinned system of music education" (Siegfried Freitag). Kaden lectured on music, philosophy and pedagogy, for example in the context of the Literarischer Verein zu Dresden, of which he was a member. He was a member of the Dresden Masonic lodge "Zum goldenen Apfel".

Kaden also excelled as a composer, creating several violin works and a symphony, among others. He also edited the Pierre Baillot Violin School.

== Family ==
In his first marriage (from 1879) he was married to the preacher's daughter Franziska Boeck from Danzig. His second wife from 1909 was Vera von Mertschinski, daughter of the Russian Empire Titular Councillor and educator to Count Shuvalov in St Petersburg. Kaden was the father of one child: Elsa (b. 1882). He died in 1923 of pneumonia in Dresden at the age of 67.

== Awards ==
He was a recipient of the Knight's Cross II Class of the Albert Order.

== Publications ==
- Parsifal im Lichte des Zeitgeistes. 2nd edition, Kaufmann, Dresden 1914.
