= Paul Walde =

German organist, composer and choral director

Paul Walde (6 February 1876 – after 1926) was a German organist, choral director and composer.

== Life ==
Walde was born in Dresden in 1876 as the son of Jakob W. Zimmermann (1850–1896) and Agnes Schneider (1849–1927). After attending the citizen's school in his hometown, he studied music at the Königliches Konservatorium Dresden from 1897 to 1900. Among his teachers were Emil Robert Höpner in organ, Carl Heinrich Döring in piano and Wilhelm Rischbieter in music theory.

From 1900, he worked as organist and choral conductor at the Garnisonkirche St. Martin, where he devoted himself in particular to Gregorian chant. He advocated the extension of the harmony system to include chromaticism. In 1914, he was the founding director of his own music school, the "Dresdner Lehranstalt für Musik". In 1922, he became organist at the Katholische Hofkirche. Walde also conducted the Dresden Cäcilienchor. He also composed organ and piano pieces as well as Lieder (such as the Lied for one singing voice Freundschaft).

He was a member of the Tonkünstlerverein Dresden, the Verband Sächsischer Musikschuldirektoren, the Deutscher Tonkünstlerverband and the Verband katholischer Kirchenbeamten.

Walde, a Catholic, was married to Barbara Ponath (born 1881) from 1926.

== Publications ==
- Die Harmonie der Neuzeit. Neue Grundsätze für die Erweiterung und technische Bezeichnung der Diatonik und Chromatik. Printed as manuscript. Dresden 1910.
