= Gerd Rienäcker =

German musicologist (1939–2018)

Gerd Rienäcker (3 May 1939 – 3 February 2018) was a German musicologist.

== Life ==
Rienäcker was born on 3 May 1939 in Göttingen as son of the chemist Günther Rienäcker. Rienäcker studied musicology from 1959 to 1964 (minor subject: "art science'") with Ernst Hermann Meyer, Georg Knepler, Walther Vetter, Peter H. Feist and Carl Heinz Claasen at the Humboldt University of Berlin, and also musical composition with Hans Georg Görner.

From 1964 to 1966 Rienäcker worked as music dramaturge (for opera, operetta, concert) at the Landestheater Eisenach. In 1966 he became scientific aspirant, from 1967 to 1985 scientific assistant at the Institute for Musicology of the Humboldt University. There he obtained a doctorate in 1973 with a thesis on dramaturgical principles in operas by Paul Dessau, Siegfried Matthus, Udo Zimmermann and Robert Hanell. Doctorate. In 1984 he habilited on the dramaturgy of the finale in operas by E. T. A. Hoffmann, Louis Spohr, Carl Maria von Weber and Heinrich Marschner. In 1985 he was appointed university lecturer, in 1988 associate professor and in 1990 professor for "Theory and History of Music Theatre" at the Humboldt University of Berlin. Since 1996 he had taught at several German universities.

His research interests were on the one hand the theory of music theatre as an institution and genre, the history of opera and operetta, Wagner's operas and dramas and Bertolt Brecht's significance for music theatre; on the other hand, the European compositional history of modern times and methodological problems of music historiography and music analysis. These interests resulted in the contents and methods of his courses (among others on the dramaturgy of music theatre, the history of notation and instrumentation, the analysis of works of opera and operetta, the analysis of music theatre productions) as well as the topics of several books and many essays.

Among his academic students were Peter Wicke, Daniela Reinhold, Antje Kaiser, Susanne Binas-Preisendörfer, Sebastian Klotz and Aniara Amos.

Rienäcker had two more siblings: Doctor Anne Rienäcker (b. 1951), married to Wilke and Doctor of physics Jürgen Rienäcker (b. 1936), whose son, the computer scientist Uwe Rienäcker, is married to the artist Sandra Rienäcker.

Rienäcker died in Berlin at age 78.

== Publications ==
=== Books ===
- Gedanken zu einigen sinfonischen Werken sowjetischer Komponisten : Einführungsmaterial für Kulturfunktionäre. Berlin: Central Committee of the German/Soviet Union Friendship, Kulturpolitik, Arbeitsgruppe Musik department, 1969
- Die 11. und 12. Sinfonie von Dmitri Schostakowitsch. Einführungsmaterial für Kulturfunktionäre. Berlin: Zentralvorstand d. Ges. f. Dt.-Sowjet. Freundschaft, Abt. Kulturpolitik, 1970 (together with Vera Reising)
- Zu einigen Aspekten dialektischer musikalisch-dramaturgischer Figureninterpretationen in neueren Werken des Opernschaffens der Deutschen Demokratischen Republik. East-Berlin, Dissertation A, 1973
- Arbeitsmaterial zur Werkanalyse. Berlin: Hauptabt. Lehrerbildung d. Ministeriums für Volksbildung, 1979/81 (together with Wilhelm Baethge and Hella Brock)
- Finali in Opern von E. T. A. Hoffmann, Louis Spohr, Heinrich Marschner und Carl Maria von Weber. Gedanken zur Theorie u. Geschichte d. Opernfinales. Berlin, Humboldt-Univ., Dissertation B, 1984
- Article in the encyclopedia Die Musik in Geschichte und Gegenwart. 2nd edition Kassel 1994 ff: Ensemble, Finale, Introduktion, Quartett (vokal), Terzett (vokal)
- Vorträge und Aufsätze 1982–2000. Sonderausgabe zum Internationalen Richard Wagner Kongress 1. bis 4. Juni 2000 in Berlin. Berlin 2000
- Richard Wagner. Nachdenken über sein "Gewebe". Berlin 2001
- Musiktheater im Experiment. Fünfundzwanzig Aufsätze. Berlin 2004

=== Essays / reports ===
- Publikationsverzeichnis der Festschrift für Gerd Rienäcker zum 65. Geburtstag (für die Jahre 1967–2004), Berlin 2004
- Gedanken zum Verhältnis musiktheoretischer Lehrsysteme zur musikgeschichtlichen Entwicklung. In Beiträge zur Musikwissenschaft. Jg. 9/2, 1967, pp. 128–133.
- Ernst Hermann Meyer – Sinfonie in B. In Heinz Alfred Brockhaus et al. (ed.): Sammelbände zur Musikgeschichte der Deutschen Demokratischen Republik. Band I. Berlin 1969, pp. 56–90.
- Vertane Chancen. Nachdenken über Bach-Bilder in der DDR. In Joachim Lüdtke (ed.): Bach und die Nachwelt. Volume 4: 1950–2000. Frankfurt/Laaber 1996/2005, pp. 97–100.
- Die industrialisierte Idylle – zur Revue 'Im Weißen Rößl, written on 30 November 1997 for the production of Jochen Biganzoli at the Kleist Theatre Frankfurt/ Oder
- Händel und die Opera seria, Berlin 2003/04
- Stichworte zu Bachs musikalischer Theologie, Berlin 2004
- Der Zauberer hinter dem Zauberer – zur Dramaturgie des ersten Finales der Oper Faust von Louis Spohr, Berlin 2004
- Fibel-Musik? Anmerkungen zu Hanns Eislers und Paul Dessaus Vertonung der "Kriegsfibel". In Nina Ermlich Lehmann (ed.): Fokus „Deutsches Miserere“ von Paul Dessau and Bertolt Brecht. Festschrift Peter Petersen zum 65. Geburtstag. Hamburg 2005, pp. 87–110.
- Im Blick zurück nach vorn : Komposition als Vermittlung zwischen Vergangenheit und Zukunft. In Maren Köster und Dörte Schmidt (ed.): „Man kehrt nie zurück, man geht immer nur fort“. Remigration und Musikkultur. Munich 2005, pp. 105–120.
- Musizieren im Zeichen Benjamins – Rückfragen an Geschriebenes. In Hanns-Werner Heister, Wolfgang Martin Stroh and Peter Wicke (ed.): Musik-Avantgarde. Zur Dialektik von Vorhut und Nachhut. Eine Gedankensammlung für Günter Mayer zum 75. Geburtstag. Oldenburg 2006, pp. 191–210.
- Wagner und die Neudeutsche Schule. In Detlef Altenburg (ed.): Liszt und die Neudeutsche Schule. (series: Weimarer Liszt-Studien, vol. 3). Laaber 2006, pp. 201–206.
- Unterwegs zu Dmitri Schostakowitsch – in fünfzehn Schritten, Berlin 2006/07
- Über das Einleiten – Gedanken zur Ouvertüre der Oper „Die Zauberflöte“ von W. A. Mozart. In Friederike Wißmann, Thomas Ahrend and Heinz von Loesch (ed.): Vom Erkennen des Erkannten. Musikalische Analyse und Editionsphilologie. Festschrift für Christian Martin Schmidt. Wiesbaden 2007, pp. 171–181.
- Peter Konwitschny – Marxist und Realist. In Anja Oeck (ed.): Musiktheater als Chance. Peter Konwitschny inszeniert. Berlin 2008, pp. 25–26.
- Thesen zur „Dreigroschenoper“. In Musik & Ästhetik. VOlume 13/50, 2009/April, pp. 85–90.
- ... von moralischen Konnotationen befreien. Über DDR-Musikgeschichte vor und nach 1989/90. In NZfM. Vol. 171, 2010/2, pp. 12–15.
- Peter Konwitschny inszeniert Verdi. In Camilla Bork et al. (ed.): Ereignis und Exegese. Musikalische Interpretation – Interpretation der Musik. Festschrift für Hermann Danuser zum 65. Geburtstag. Schliengen 2011, pp. 516–527.
- Stichworte zu Bachs musikalischer Theologie. In Thomas Phleps and Wieland Reich (ed.): Musik-Kontexte. Festschrift für Hanns-Werner Heister. Vol. 2. Münster 2011, pp. 737–749.
- ... aber ändre die Welt, sie braucht es! In Ulrich Tadday (ed.): Hanns Eisler. Angewandte Musik. (series: Musikkonzepte, Sonderband). Munich 2012, pp. 64–81.
- Künftigen Glückes gewiß, gewiß, gewiß. – fünf Sätze über Eislers "Ernste Gesänge" In Hartmut Krones (ed.): Hanns Eisler. Ein Komponist ohne Heimat?. (series: Schriften des Wissenschaftszentrums Arnold Schönberg, vol. 6). Vienna 2012, pp. 109–115.
- Hanns Eisler – ein Sonderfall. In Hartmut Krones (ed.): Hanns Eisler. Ein Komponist ohne Heimat?. (series: Schriften des Wissenschaftszentrums Arnold Schönberg, vol. 6). Vienna 2012,pp. 331–340.
- Musizieren über Traditionen. Die Soldaten von Bernd Alois Zimmermann, Einstein by Paul Dessau. In Detlef Altenburg and Rainer Bayreuther (ed.): Musik und kulturelle Identität. (Report on the XIII International Congress of the Society for Music Research, Weimar 2004). Vol. 2: Symposien B. Kassel 2012, pp. 259–265.
- Musik im Raum – Musik als Raum? Notate zu einigen Passagen des Requiems von Berlioz. In: Veronika Busch et al. (ed.): Wahrnehmung, Erkenntnis, Vermittlung. Musikwissenschaftliche Brückenschläge. Festschrift für Wolfgang Auhagen zum sechzigsten Geburtstag. Hildesheim 2013, pp. 157–166.
- Ernst Hermann Meyer über Georg Friedrich Händel – einige Notate. Händel-Jahrbuch. Vol. 60, 2014, pp. 97–108.
- Schostakowitschs Klage um Jüdisches Leid. In Deutsche Schostakowitsch-Gesellschaft (ed.): Schostakowitsch-Aspekte. Analysen und Studien Berlin 2014, pp. 89–96.
