= Schertel =

Schertel is a surname. Notable people with the surname include:

- Ernst Schertel (1884–1958), German author
- Fritz Schertel (1890–1945), German cellist, brother of Ernst
