= Johannes Georg Pahn =

German physician, speech therapist and music educator

Johannes Georg Pahn (30 December 1931 – 1 December 2015) was a German physician, speech therapist and music educator. He was a co-founder of phoniatrics in Germany.

== Life ==
Pahn, Roman Catholic, was born in 1931 in Dresden, the capital of Saxony, the son of the teacher Max Paul Pahn and the furrier master Erna Maria Pahn. He attended secondary school in Pirna from 1942 and gained his first experience as a choirmaster and organist in Heidenau southeast of Dresden, where the family resided.

After his Abitur in Pirna in 1950, he studied music education, German studies and speech training at the Martin Luther University Halle-Wittenberg until 1953. In 1954/55, he worked as a music teacher in Halle. From 1954 to 1959, he held lectureships in speech training at the Karl-Marx-Universität Leipzig and in singing and vocal physiology at the Staatliche Hochschule für Theater und Musik Halle and Martin Luther University Halle-Wittenberg. In 1955/56, he was a subject group leader at the Halle Folk Music School (Saalkreis). From 1956 to 1958, he was a research assistant at the Institute for Speech Studies at the Martin Luther University Halle-Wittenberg. He was eventually dismissed and had no permanent position in 1958/59 because of his lack of party affiliation. Until 1959, he worked as a concert singer, singing teacher, organist and choir director. From 1959 to 1961, he worked as a University lecturer for speech training at the Erfurt Pedagogical Institute. In 1960, he was awarded a doctorate by the music pedagogue Fritz Reuter at the Pedagogical Faculty of the Humboldt University of Berlin with the dissertation Stimmphysiologische Untersuchungen der Verspannungserscheinungen beim Singen. Ein Beitrag zur Grundlagenforschung der Methodik des Gesangsunterrichts (A contribution to basic research into the methodology of singing lessons).

From 1960 to 1968, he was a speech scientist at the Ear, Nose and Throat Clinic of the Medizinische Akademie Erfurt. There he founded a phoniatric department. In 1967 he passed an external Staatsexamen in speech education at the Martin Luther University Halle-Wittenberg. Parallel to his professional activities, he completed his medical studies at the University of Jena and the University of Erfurt from 1962 to 1968. In 1968, he passed the Staatsexamen in medicine.

From 1968 to 1988, he was an assistant at the ENT clinic of the Wilhelm-Pieck University Rostock. There he was trained as specialist and founded the department of phoniatrics-paediatric audiology. In 1974, he submitted the Promotion B (Dr. sc. med.) on the topic Die phoniatrische Tauglichkeitsuntersuchung für pädagogische Berufsgruppen. Grundlagen, gegenwärtiger Stand, gesellschaftliche Bedeutung und Weiterentwicklung . In 1977, he became attending physician. From 1988, he was an associate lecturer at the University of Rostock. In 1992 he became a lecturer to date in law for otorhinolaryngology. In 1994/95 he was Privatdozent and from 1995 until emeritus in 1999 Außplanmäßige Professor for phoniatrics/pädaudiologie at the Universitätsmedizin Rostock. From 1991 to 1994, he acted as deputy to the acting director of the Rostock ENT Clinic.

Based on his involvement with music and medicine, he developed methods for voice therapy from the nasalisation method and the electrostimulation of the larynx. methods for voice therapy. He has given lectures and workshops in many European countries and Canada. In 1999, he founded a Höhere Berufsfachschule for speech-language pathology at the European Business and Language Academy Rostock. This was under his Medical Director and developed into a university of applied sciences in 2003 in cooperation with the university of applied sciences for speech-language pathology in Eindhoven (Netherlands) into a university of applied sciences. He was a member of the interdisciplinary Deutschsprachige Gesellschaft für Sprach- und Stimmheilkunde (DGSS; from 1995 until 2003 president, later honorary president) and the Deutsche Gesellschaft für Phoniatrie und Pädaudiologie.

Pahn died at the age of 73.

== Awards ==
In 1985, he was awarded the Hermann Gutzmann Medal of the German Society for Phoniatrics and Paedaudiology.

== Publications ==
- Stimmübungen für Sprechen und Singen. Verlag Volk und Gesundheit VEB, Berlin 1968 (translation in Dutch 1987).
- with Elke Pahn: Die Nasalierungsmethode. Übungsverfahren der Sprech- und Singstimme zur Therapie und Prophylaxe von Störungen und Erkrankungen. Mit Verfahren der neuromuskulären elektrophonatorischen Simulation (NMEPS) von Kehlkopfparesen. Oehmke, Roggentin/Rostock 2000, ISBN 978-3-9806763-1-1 (translation in Dutch 2000).
- with Antoinette Lamprecht-Dinnesen, Annergse Keilmann, Kurt Bielfeld and Eberhard Seifert (ed.): Sprache und Musik. Beiträge der 71. Jahrestagung der Deutschen Gesellschaft für Sprach- und Stimmheilkunde e.V., Berlin, 12. – 13 March 1999 (Beiträge der Jahrestagung der Deutschen Gesellschaft für Sprach- und Stimmheilkunde e.V. Vol. 71). Steiner, Stuttgart 2000, ISBN 978-3-515-07544-2.
