= Fritz Schertel =

German cellist

Friedrich Schertel (13 February 1890 – 5 April 1945) was a German cello virtuoso.

== Life ==
Born in Schweinfurt, Schertel was the youngest son of the bank accountant and later State bank director Sigmund Schertel and his wife Marie Schertel, née Pfeiffer. After grammar school in Hof, he studied at the Ludwig-Maximilians-Universität München.

From 1909 to 1912, he studied music at the Hochschule für Musik und Theater München. In 1913/14, he received private cello lessons from Julius Klengel in Leipzig. From 1919 to 1921, he was a cellist in Henri Marteau's String Quartet. In 1921/22, he was a principal cellist with the Dresden Philharmonic. From 1922, he was a teacher at the University of Music and Theatre Leipzig. Among his pupils were Erich Hillmann and Hans Kral. In 1933, he also became a member of the Gewandhaus Orchestra in Leipzig. He was repeatedly invited to join the Bayreuth Festival Orchestra (1924/25, 1927/28, 1930/31, 1933/34, 1936–1944).

Schertel belonged to the string quartet of Walther Davisson. He was later a member of Hans Mlynarczyk's String Quartet (1923–1943) and the Arthur Bohnhardt's String Quartet (1938–1943) and of Fritz Weitzmann's Trio He also made solo appearances, bringing the Concerto for Violoncello and Orchestra by Fritz Reuter to its premiere in 1929 at the Mitteldeutsche Rundfunk AG under the conduct of Alfred Szendrei.

He was also a member of the Deutscher Tonkünstlerverband.

== Family ==
His brothers were Wilhelm Schertel (1883–1930), chemist and artist, and Ernst Schertel (1884–1958), writer and educator. A portrait sketch of the cellist made by Otto Pleß appeared in 1934 in an article on personalities of Leipzig musical life in the Zeitschrift für Musik. Schertel, a Catholic, was married to Magda Laier and the father of a son. During the air raid on Bayreuth in April 1945, the family perished. Schertel was 55.
