= Günther Noll =

German musicologist

Günther Noll (born 24 August 1927) is a German music educator and university faculty.

== Education and professional career ==
Noll was born in Staßfurt. After training at the Institute for Teacher Education in Staßfurt with 1st and 2nd teacher examinations and subsequent school service, he began studying school music/musicology at the Humboldt University of Berlin in 1952–1956, graduating with a Staatsexamen for the upper school.

During his subsequent time as a research assistant and lecturer at the Humboldt University of Berlin, he was awarded a doctorate in music education by Fritz Reuter at the Faculty of Education in 1960 with the dissertation Untersuchungen über die musikerzieherische Bedeutung Jean-Jacques Rousseaus und seine Ideen. Allgemeiner Überblick und spezielle Darstellung seiner Ziffernschrift als Anfang einer modernen Musikmethodik. Ein Beitrag zu ihrer Geschichte PhD. In 1961, he moved to the Federal Republic of Germany. There he became a research assistant to the Deutscher Musikrat in the Liaison Office for Intergovernmental Relations (Cologne 1962–1964). After the 1st and 2nd state philological examinations for the teaching profession at higher schools (Cologne 1964) and a subsequent school career up to the level of Oberstudienrat, he went to the Pädagogische Hochschule Rheinland, Bonn department, as a research assistant and lecturer, where he Habilitated and was then appointed Wissenschaftlicher Rat und Professor. After a lectureship at the University of Wuppertal (1973-1974), he was appointed full professor of music and its didactics with a focus on musical folklore at the Neuss department of the Pädagogische Hochschule Rheinland in 1976 and director of the Institute for Musical Folklore. With the transfer of the Neuss department to the University of Düsseldorf in 1980, he began teaching there. In 1985, he was called to the University of Cologne and in 1986 also was transferred of the Institute for Musical Folklore. In 1992 he became emeritus.

== Activity ==
Extensive artistic activity as choirmaster and ensemble leader at schools and colleges, numerous concerts and events, especially with the Folklore Ensemble Bonn 1966–1976. Leader of teacher training weeks, speaker at numerous conferences and congresses, also abroad. Initiator and co-founder of the working group "Research in Music Education" (today: "Arbeitskreis Musikpädagogische Forschung e.V."), many years on the board. First spokesperson of the Bundesfachgruppe Musikpädagogik (association of music teacher training institutions) in 1972–1975, board member from 1985 to 1989, conference leader. Collaborator in university curricular subject group commissions, member of expert commissions of the Deutscher Musikrat. From 1975 to 1980 editor and co-editor of the scientific journals Musik und Bildung and Forschung in der Musikerziehung, 1979-1992 editor of ad marginem. From 1980 to 1984 Chairman of the Fachgruppe Musikpädagogik Nordrhein and 2nd Chairman of the Landesfachgruppe NRW. From 1985 to 1994 second chairman of the Arbeitsgemeinschaft für rheinische Musikgeschichte, 1994-1995 first chairman. 1988-1996 Chairman of the Commission for Song, Music and Dance Research (now Commission for the Research of Musical Folk Cultures) in the Deutsche Gesellschaft für Volkskunde.

== Honours ==
- Presentation of the Medal of Honour of the University of Nantes (1983)
- Verdienstorden der Bundesrepublik Deutschland am Bande (2 November 1995).
- Festschrift (2002)

== Work ==
Numerous publications in music folklore and music education with a focus on Laienmusizieren; Lied research (Lied reception, Lied monography, children's lieder, dialect lied); oppositional spiritual youth singing in the GDR dictatorship; custom research; folklore research; street music; teaching and curriculum research; motivation and creativity research; improvisation didactics; historical music education; music teacher training; textbook author and editor.

- Musikalische Volkskultur im Rheinland : aktuelle Forschungsbeiträge : Bericht über die Jahrestagung 1991.
- Liedbegleitsätze für das Klassenmusizieren mit Orff- und anderen Schlaginstrumenten.
