= Münnich =

Münnich is a surname. Notable people with the surname include:

- Count Burkhard Christoph von Münnich (1683 – 1767), German nobleman and general in the Russian army
- Ferenc Münnich (1886–1967), Hungarian politician
- René Münnich (born 1977), German racing driver and team owner
  - Münnich Motorsport, auto racing team
- Richard Münnich (1877–1970), German musicologist and music pedagogue
