= Wassili Leps =

American conductor

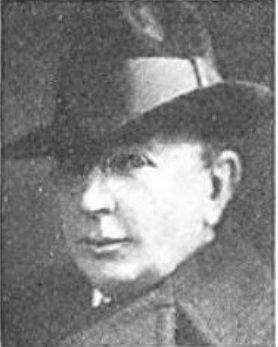
Wassili Leps

Wassili Leps (May 12, 1870 – December 22, 1942) was a Russian-born American composer and conductor.

Leps was born near Saint Petersburg. He graduated from the Royal Conservatory of Dresden, where he studied with Franz Wüllner, Wilhelm Rischbieter, Doering, Eduard Rappoldi, and Draeseke.

He came to the United States in 1894. He first went to New Orleans, and then settled in Philadelphia, where he lived in The Powelton apartments and became active in Philadelphia's musical circles.

He directed and conducted the Philadelphia Operatic Society and the Philadelphia Quartette Club. He became assistant conductor of the Philadelphia Orchestra, under Carl Pohlig until 1912 and then under Stokowski (and then took over some of Stokowski's engagements as conductor of the Cincinnati Orchestra's summer seasons). He directed the Civic Symphony Orchestra. He taught piano, organ, and composition at Richard Zeckwer's Philadelphia Musical Academy and out of his own studio. He was organist and music director at the Episcopal Church of the Saviour, and at St. James Roman Catholic Church.

He hired Philadelphia Orchestra musicians to form the Wassili Leps Orchestra, which he took on tour, often with guest vocalists, and that group often performed at the summer music festivals in Willow Grove Park. In 1912, 1915, and 1916, the Wassili Leps Orchestra performed engagements at the Pittsburgh Exhibitions, performing Russian music, operatic excerpts, and featuring the work of local Pittsburgh composers Fidelis Zitterbart Jr., Ethelbert Nevin, and Adolph Foerster.

In the 1920s, he established himself in New York City. He conducted the orchestra at the opening night performances at the Loew's Lexington Avenue Opera House in 1923. He taught piano and voice out of a studio in Steinway Hall and was the organist at St. Peter's Evangelical church in Brooklyn.

In 1932, he became director and conductor of the two-year-old Providence Symphony Orchestra in Rhode Island, a position he held until his death. He taught advanced classes at the Providence College of Music. He was awarded an honorary doctorate from Brown University in 1934. He was the Rhode Island state director for the Federal Music Project.

As a composer, he wrote mostly for voice, at large and small scales. He wrote several japonisme operas set to texts by fellow Philadelphian John Luther Long (best remembered for authoring Madame Butterfly), with whom he was well acquainted.

He was married and had a daughter, Olga Leps. He died in 1942 in Toronto.

== Legacy ==
Hugh MacColl, Rhode Island composer and president of the Providence Symphony Orchestra, dedicated his Ballad for piano and orchestra, and his Arabs (Symphonic Illustration) to Leps and the Providence Symphony Orchestra. MacColl's will established the Wassili Leps Foundation in 1953, through this foundation Brown University's Department of Music funded an award for and publication of compositions by Rhode Island composers. Awards began in 1956, past winners have included:

- 1956: Edward Diemente, 1st prize for Postscript to War, a song setting poetry from a World War II Japanese soldier, and 2nd prize for wind quintet The White Deer, inspired by Thurber's novel.
- 1957: Walter Legawiec for Episodes for chorus and piano.
- 1964: Jack Gottlieb
- 1968: Wallace DePue, honorable mention
- unknown dates: Paul Nelson, Ned Rorem, Robert Revicki

Among his students were Phil Boutelje, Celeste de Longpré Heckscher, Jeanette MacDonald, and Irving Gertz.

== Selected compositions ==
- Yo-Nennen: a Japanese cicada drama set to music in the form of a cantata, op. 11, for 4-part women's chorus, text by John Luther Long (1905). Dedicated "to the Eurydice Chorus and their esteemed conductor Mr. Fritz Scheel".
- The Miracle of Gar-Anlaf, op. 15, cantata for men's chorus and orchestra (1907), dedicated to "the Orpheus Club and Mr. Fritz Scheel as a token of esteem and friendship".
- Andon, symphony in 4 movements for orchestra, chorus, and STB soli. Story and poem by John Luther Long. Premiered by the Philadelphia Orchestra under Fritz Scheel.
- Hoshi-San, opera (1909), libretto by John Luther Long based on an expansion of his earlier work Andon. Premiered in Philadelphia in 1909.
- Nirvana, a work premiered by Stokowski with the Philadelphia Orchestra in 1913, with soprano Helen MacNamee-Bentz.
- The Song of Liberty, WWI song for voice and piano, lyrics by Franklin Crispin (1918). Written for the National Fraternal Congress' Great Patriotic Fraternal Conclave in Philadelphia in August 1918, it was premiered in Independence Square by Florence Easton.
- Loretto, premiered by Stokowski and the Philadelphia Orchestra in 1925.
- The Liberty Bell: Paean for the Sesquicentennial, song (1926), lyrics by Julia Beare O'Donoghue
- Christmas, song, lyrics by Myrtle Dunn
- Skallagrim (Grim the Bald), operetta in three acts, libretto by Richard West Saunders based on the Egil's Saga character Skalla-Grímr. Only two very brief excerpts of the score were published in Saunders' privately printed libretto.
- America Forever, march dedicated to John Philip Sousa, never published, manuscript held by Sousa Archives at University of Illinois
- Home, Sweet Home, 3-act musical comedy based on Frederick Bruegger's story Her Daddy's Daughter, libretto by Bruegger
