= Karl Kamann =

German operatic bass

Karl Kamann (19 December 1899 – 10 April 1959) was a German operatic bass-baritone.

== Life ==
Kamann was born in Cologne. He received singing lessons from Kammersänger Max Büttner in Karlsruhe. He also trained in Milan. In 1920/21, he received his first engagement at the Badisches Staatstheater Karlsruhe. He then worked in Freiburg (1921 to 1924), Nuremberg (1924 to 1927), Brunswick (1927 to 1931) and Chemnitz (1931 to 1937).

In 1937, he became a member of the Vienna State Opera. There, he distinguished himself in particular as a Heldenbaritone and Wagner performer. In 1938, he made his debut under Wilhelm Furtwängler at the Salzburg Festival as Hans Sachs in Wagner's Die Meistersinger von Nürnberg. He also first sang Wotan in Wagner's Die Walküre at the Royal Opera House in London's Covent Garden. In 1952, he made his first appearance at the Bayreuth festival. In 1954, he appeared at the Maggio Musicale Fiorentino as Lysiart in Weber's Euryanthe. Further guest appearances took him to opera houses throughout Europe (Paris, Berlin, Munich, Brussels, Liège, Bordeaux, Venice, Rome, Florence, Naples, Trieste, Copenhagen, Amsterdam, London, Liverpool, Palermo, Catania, Naples, Perugia, The Hague, Barcelona) and Brazil. At the reopening of the Vienna State Opera in 1955, he sang the Minister in Beethoven's Fidelio. His last appearance was in 1958 as Borromeo in Pfitzner's Palestrina.

His repertoire was very extensive: In addition to Wagner operas, he sang among others Tiefland (Sebastino), Salome (Jochanaan), Königskinder (Spielmann), Wozzeck (title role), Rigoletto (title role), Aida (Amonasro), Cavalleria rusticana (Alfio), Der Rosenkavalier (Faninal), Tosca (Scarpia), La fanciulla del West (Jack Rance), Carmen (Escamillo), Les Huguenots (Nevers), Tales of Hoffmann (Demons), Boris Godunov (title role), Pelléas et Mélisande (Golo) and Jonny spielt auf (Jonny). In 1930, he performed Fritz Reuters's cantata Huttens letzte Tage at its premiere.

Kamann was a member of the Guild of the German Stage.

His first marriage was to Lily Borsa. His second wife was the soprano Herma Schramm. In 1959, he died in the Hanusch Hospital in the 14th district of Vienna at the age of 59.

== Awards ==
- 1952: Kammersänger
