= Horst Irrgang =

German composer, conductor and musicologist

Horst Irrgang (1929 – 1997) was a German composer, conductor and musicologist.

== Life and career ==
Born in Magdeburg, Irrgang studied school music in Weimar from 1948 to 1954, German studies at Jena University and music education (with Fritz Reuter) and musicology (with Max Schneider) at Halle University. As a composer and conductor, he devoted himself to amateur music throughout his life. From 1954 to 1958, he was artistic director of the folk art ensemble of the VEB Leuna-Werke Walter Ulbricht. In 1958, he took over the choral direction of the Louis Fürnberg ensemble of the University of Leipzig, which he held until 1965. Towards the end of the 1950s, he simultaneously took over the direction of the choir at VEB Hochbauprojektierung Halle. Irrgang was a board member of the Verband der Komponisten und Musikwissenschaftler der DDR and for many years the head of the folk music section of the Halle/Magdeburg district association.

As a musicologist, Irrgang had been an editor at VEB Breitkopf & Härtel in Leipzig since 1959 (Deutscher Verlag für Musik). He published numerous choral and song books with his own settings, which were part of the standard repertoire of numerous choirs, especially in the GDR. He also wrote instrumental sets of German folk and children's songs, for example for two recorders or two violins, which appeared in multiple editions.

His better-known works include the "picture book with music" Bummi in Afrika (1967) with texts by Ursula Werner-Böhnke and illustrations by Ingeborg Meyer-Rey. A sequel appeared in 1976 under the title Bummi am Nordpol. These compositions by Irrgang consist of easy-to-sing songs with piano accompaniment that can also be performed orchestrally. Lyrics and songs allow for performance in a school context or even in recreational settings. His songs have also been broadcast on radio.

In 1989, he was awarded the Handel Prize of the city of Halle.

== Work ==
- Schneeflöckchen, Weissröckchen (BDV 758), Leipzig: Deutscher Verlag für Musik 1960.
- Die spanische Hochzeit. Gedichtballadeskes Poem mit Musik und Tanz nach einem Gedicht von Louis Fürnberg. (Uraufführung 1965 im Deutsches Nationaltheater in Weimar).
- Bummi in Afrika. Leipzig: Deutscher Verlag für Musik 1967.
- Bummi am Nordpol. Leipzig: Deutscher Verlag für Musik 1976.
- Schneemann Ladislaus. Zyklus für Kinderstimme solo, Kinderchor, Schlagwerk und Klavier. Leipzig: Deutscher Verlag für Musik 1980.
- Frohes Leben Tag für Tag. Heitere und besinnliche zeitgenössische Chorlieder für Männerchor a cappella bzw. mit Klavier. Leipzig: Friedrich Hofmeister 1982.
- Ringelrosen, Rittersporn. Kinderlieder und Kinderzeichnungen. 3rd edition. Leipzig: Deutscher Verlag für Musik 1985.
- Ein Männlein steht im Walde. Leipzig: Deutscher Verlag für Musik. 9th edition 1988.
- Frei und froh durchs Leben gehen (Chorpartitur). Halle: Bezirkskabinett für Kulturarbeit 1990.
- Drei Laub' auf einer Linden (Partitur). Frankfurt: Edition Ferrimontana, 1997.
