= Albert Richard Sendrey =

American composer and conductor

Albert Richard Sendrey, also Albert Richard Szendrei, (26 December 1911 – 18 May 2003) was an American composer, conductor and arranger of Austro-Hungarian origin. Sendrey is the son of the Hungarian-born composer, conductor and musicologist Alfred Szendrei. His mother, Eugenie (birth name: Eugenie Weisz), worked as a soprano at the Vienna State Opera under Gustav Mahler.

== Life and career ==
Sendrey was born into a family of musicians in Chicago in 1911 during his father's time as a theatre conductor. He studied with his father and attended the University of Music and Theatre Leipzig and the Conservatoire de Paris, as well as the Trinity College of Music in London. He was a student of Albert Coats, John Barbirolli and Henry Geehl. From 1935 to 1937, he worked as an arranger for film companies in Paris and from 1937 to 1944 in London.

As a Jew, Sendrey fled from the National Socialists around 1933, first to Paris with his family. The Battle of France in May and June 1940 forced the family to flee further to the United States where they changed their Hungarian surname "Szendrei" to the Americanized spelling "Sendrey". Albert Sendrey settled in Hollywood.

Among other works, Sendrey wrote the ballet Danse d'odalisque, three symphonies, an Oriental Suite for Orchestra (1935), a toccata and a fugue for orchestra. He also wrote chamber music: two string quartets, a duo for horn and viola, a Divertimento for violoncello, a concertina for piano. His main field of work as a composer was film and television music. He composed film and television scores like Laramie for example. He also wrote for MGM Musicals like Peter Pan (New York 1954) and New Faces of 1956. He also composed special music for nightclubs. In total, Sendrey composed, arranged and orchestrated the music for about 170 film and television productions. From 1956 to 1964 he also worked as a pianist and conductor for the pop singer and actor Tony Martin.

Sendrey died in Woodland Hills, Los Angeles at the age of 91.
