= Rolf Lukowsky =

German composer (1926–2021)

Rolf (Rudolf) Lukowsky (14 July 1926 – 25 July 2021) was a German composer and choral director.

== Youth and education ==
Lukowsky's father Josef was organist and choirmaster at the Catholic St. Petrus (Berlin-Gesundbrunnen). Already as a schoolboy, Lukowsky sang in the Choir of St. Hedwig's Cathedral and in the choir of the Berlin State Opera. At the instigation of his father, he did not become a member of the Hitler Youth or the Deutsches Jungvolk, but of the Catholic youth organisations Quickborn-Arbeitskreis and Bund Neudeutschland. After primary school he attended the Canisius-Kolleg Berlin until its closure in 1940. After completing his Reichsarbeitsdienst, he volunteered as a reserve officer. Due to disciplinary misconduct, he was not promoted to sergeant, which, according to his own assessment, saved him from deployment to the Eastern Front in World War II.

After the end of the war, the family found accommodation in Saxony-Anhalt. Lukowsky joined the Free German Youth and trained as a Neulehrer. In 1948, he founded the Ernst Thälmann Pioneer Organisation. From 1950 to 1956, he directed the Buna choir in Halle.

In 1954, he began a two-year study of music education for the upper school at the Martin Luther University of Halle-Wittenberg. His teachers included Max Schneider, Walther Siegmund-Schultze, Siegfried Bimberg and Fritz Reuter. With Siegfried Bimberg (1927-2008) and Friedrich Krell (1928-2020), the Institute for Music Education there produced two more graduates who later had a formative influence on choral music in the GDR.

== Further career ==
In 1956, he became a member of the SED. 50 years later, he describes his political attitude as follows:

… Let's put it this way: I think socialist. However, under different circumstances I would probably never have become a socialist or a communist... If I had gone to Bonn to study medicine after the war, things would have developed completely differently.

—

In the same year, he followed his composition professor Fritz Reuter to the Humboldt University Berlin and began an Aspirantur, which ended in 1959 with the promotion to Doktor. At the same time, he taught students music theory, folk song and choral conducting. During this time, he also founded the chamber choir of the Institute for Music Education. He completed another aspirancy in 1961 with the habilitation and was subsequently appointed lecturer in music theory and university music director. In concerts with the choirs of the university and the Collegium musicum instrumentale, which he also founded, he performed his own compositions and works by other contemporary artists as well as classical works; in addition, he made recordings for disks, radio and television.

In 1964, he ended his teaching career and turned to other priorities. He became chairman of the Berlin Composers' Association. Since the end of the 1950s, he had already worked in a responsible position at the federal executive committee of the Free German Trade Union Federation, among other things as editorial director of the FDGB-Liederblätter and musical organiser of the Arbeiterfestspiele der DDR, which had been held since 1959. In this context, he met the singer and actor Ernst Busch in 1965, whereupon a close musical collaboration developed that lasted until his death. Lukowsky arranged and composed for Busch, rehearsed with him and accompanied him as pianist and conductor at performances and recordings.

In addition to these diverse commitments, he still found time for productive composition. His first song Fleißig, nur fleißig, ihr Mädel und Jungen had already appeared around 1949. During his work at the HU, he wrote several cantatas and choral cycles, which he performed and recorded with his ensembles. In addition, he wrote many commissions for the Rundfunk-Jugendchor Wernigerode, directed by Friedrich Krell, including the cantata Wir freun uns auf den Wind von morgen (text Rainer Kirsch), which premiered in 1963. These compositions were mostly intended for official occasions and accordingly had a pro-socialist, State-supporting content. Even after the end of the GDR, his numerous arrangements of folk songs in various degrees of difficulty, which were widely disseminated through recordings, among other things, have remained popular. After 1990, he also wrote settings of sacred texts.

In an interview he describes his activities during these years as follows:

I made at least five or six recordings a week with my own choirs on the radio or on disks. In addition, I prepared and arranged ten to twenty recordings a month for the radio youth choir in Wernigerode, mainly with my own stuff, and produced basic tapes with orchestra if needed. Then came Busch with maybe four to six dates a month. [...] And in between I sat at home and wrote music. …

—

== Trivia ==
Lukowsky's father Josef (1896-1973), a pupil of Carl Thiel, was also a choral conductor and composer and for a time held a lectureship at Humboldt University, as did his son later. Lukowsky was married and lived in Bernau near Berlin. By his own account, he bought and owned "all the songbooks there are".

In 1983, he received the National Prize of the GDR III. class for art and literature, and in 1987 the Goethe-Preis der Stadt Berlin.

== Work ==
=== Lieder ===
- Winterlied (Auf die Straßen fällt ein Schnee)

=== Liedbearbeitungen ===
- Abend wird es wieder
- Als wir jüngst in Regensburg waren
- Das anmutige, schöne Weiß
- Das Heidenröslein
- Das Lieben bringt groß Freud
- Der Mond ist aufgegangen
- Der Schneider Jahrtag
- Es kommt ein Schiff geladen
- Heißa, Kathreinerle
- Herbei, o ihr Gläubigen
- Horch, was kommt von draußen rein
- Im schönsten Wiesengrunde
- Leise zieht durch mein Gemüt
- Nicht die Zeiten sind schlecht
- Schönster Abendstern
- Weiß mir ein Blümlein blaue
- Wenn alle Brünnlein fließen
- Wie schön blüht uns der Maien

=== Secular works ===
- Breitet leuchtend euch im Blauen
- Eisler-Zitate nach Sinnsprüchen und einer Zwölftonreihe des Komponisten Hanns Eisler
- Lied vom Klassenfeind
- Sine musica nulla vita
- Wir freun uns auf den Wind von morgen (cantata)

=== Sacred works ===
- Ave Maria
- Missa vocale Romanum
- Pater noster
- Salve, Regina

=== Audio samples ===
- Als wir jüngst zu Regensburg waren (Bearbeitung)
- Geht der Tag mit leisem Schritt (Chorleiter)
