= Siegfried Bimberg =

German composer, conductor and musicologist

Siegfried Bimberg (5 May 1927 – 2 July 2008) was a German composer, conductor and musicologist

== Life ==
Born in Halle (Saale), After his return from the war and captivity, Bimberg completed his pedagogical studies. After working briefly at a one-grade rural school, he studied psychology, music education and musicology at the Martin Luther University of Halle-Wittenberg. His teachers included among others Max Schneider, Kurt Prautzsch and Hans Ahrbeck. In 1953, he was awarded a doctorate from Fritz Reuter at the Faculty of Education with the dissertation Untersuchungen zur Hör- und Singfähigkeit in Dur und in Moll. Ein Beitrag zur Musiktheorie und zur Musikpsychologie. In 1956, Bimberg won his habilitation with a thesis Über das Singen der Großterz aufwärts. Ein Beitrag zur Musikpsychologie und Musikästhetik auf der Grundlage elektro-optischer Untersuchungen. At the same time, Bimberg worked as a publishing editor from 1953 to 1958. In 1957, he took on a lectureship at the Humboldt University of Berlin, but returned to Halle in 1962 to teach there, first as a lecturer and then, from 1964, as a professor at the Martin Luther University. In the process, Bimberg held the chair of music education from 1969 until his retirement in 1992. His field, however, included aesthetics of music and music psychology. In 1981 he habilitated again (Kontrast als musikpädagogische Kategorie).

Bimberg made a name for himself primarily through numerous youth and children's songs, choral works and children's operas and arrangements for choir. His Rodellied (Schneemann bau'n und Schneeballschlacht) was part of the standard repertoire in kindergartens and schools in the GDR and was extremely popular.

In 1963, he founded the Chamber Choir Hallenser Madrigalisten, of which he was conductor until 1980. With this choir, he undertook an active concert career at home and abroad with both old and new choral music. In addition to record and CD productions and productions for radio and television, Bimberg also organised workshops, studios and courses for choral conductors.

In 1951, Bimberg founded his own system for ear training, the basis of which is a relative-functional basis in close connection with absolute notation using the jale syllables and tonic-do hand signs.

In 1968, he was awarded the Handel Prize of the Halle district.

Bimberg died in Halle at the age of 81.

== Work ==
=== Cycles ===
- Wir spielen durch das Jahr (1957)
- Morgen kann die Welt schon brennen (1959)
- Legende von der Entstehung des Buches Taoteking auf dem Weg des Laotse in die Emigration (1959)
- Kantate vom Apfelbaum (1966)
- Daß im Herd die Glut uns kein Wind vertreibt (1972)
- Wir entdecken unser Land (1974)
- Rügen-Suite (with Rolf Lukowsky) (1978)
- Bilderbuchseiten (1979)
- Das Fest des Tannenbaums (1989)
- Die Rosen schlafen nicht (1990)
- Ohne Natur vergeht unser Leben (1997)
- Ruhrpottgedichte (1997)
- Vom Wind getragen (1997)
- Vier Sprüche, das Glück festzuhalten (1997)
- Verba nulla pretio emuntur (1998)
- Mit Degen und Fagott (2000)
- De amicitia (2000)
- Sonne, Mond und Sterne (2002)
- Pretzscher Spektakel (2002)
- Zwischen Nil und Ninive (2003)

=== Children Operas ===
- Das singende Pferdchen (1961)
- Eulenspiegels Brautfahrt (1987)

=== Other ===
- Es ist für uns eine Zeit angekommen (Satz)
- O Tannenbaum (Satz nach Volksweise)
- Still, still, still, weils Kindlein schlafen will (Satz)

== Publications ==
Bimberg's writings include among others experimental-psychological works on tonality research, in which he deals with the equivalence of major and minor in music, on perception (law of "relative constancy") or on the relation of different acoustic tuning when singing intervals in Gregorian and harmonical orientation (law of "variable reagent"). In addition, he also dealt with music-aesthetic and music-pedagogical topics, such as for example the fundamentals of music reception (known as the position of the"Dialogischen Musikaneignung").

- Einführung in die Musikpsychologie (1957)
- Vom Singen zum Musikverstehen. (with F. Bachmann and Chr. Lange) (1957ff.)
- Methodisch-didaktische Grundlagen der Musikerziehung (1968, 1973)
- Handbuch der Musikästhetik (publisher and author) (1979ff.)
- Kontrast als musikästhetische Kategorie (1981)
- Handbuch der Chorleitung (publisher and author) (1981)
- Lieder lernen, Lieder singen (1981ff.)
- Ferruccio Busoni: Von der Macht der Töne (publisher) (1983)
- Musik – Erleben – Lernen (1995)
- Nachhall 1 und 2 (1996)
- Musikwissenschaft und Musikpädagogik, Perspektiven für das 21.Jahrhundert (with Guido Bimberg) (1997)
- Lieder von Wende zu Wende, das deutsche Gemeinschaftslied im 20. Jahrhundert (1998)
