= Richard Schmidt (cantor) =

German cantor and organist

Richard Schmidt (16 June 1877 – 1958 in Dresden) was a German cantor and organist.

== Life ==
Schmidt was born in 1877 as the son of the cantor Wilhelm Schmidt (1851–1896) and his wife Auguste Helbig in Oderwitz, Amtshauptmannschaft Löbau, Saxony. After attending the Dresden Kreuzschule (1888–1896), he worked as an assistant organist at the Trinitatiskirche. From 1896 to 1900, he studied piano and organ at the Königlichen Konservatorium Dresden.

From 1900 to 1902 he worked as répétiteur at the Semperoper Dresden. From 1901 to 1916, he was cantor and organist at the Jakobikirche and from 1903 to 1928 a teacher at the Dresden Conservatory. From 1913 to 1928, he was a music teacher at the Dresden Kreuzschule. From 1916 to 1945 he was cantor and organist at the Erlöserkirche, where he was substituted by Cantor Reiche during his military service. From 1928, he was a lecturer in piano, organ and music theory at the orchestral school of the Sächsische Staatskapelle Dresden. After the destruction in World War II, he participated in countless cantatas and oratorios under Cantor Johannes John at the Herz-Jesu-Kirche.

He was a member of the Deutscher Tonkünstlerverband, the Neue Bachgesellschaft and the Tonkünstlervereins Dresden.

Schmidt, Protestant, was married to Elsa Röber from 1904 and father of a son.
