= Beate Albrecht =

German violinist (1921–2017)

- Born: Beate Rabich; 23 May 1921; Gotha
- Died: 2017 (aged 95–96) Dresden
- Occupations: Musician, music educator
- Instrument: Violin

Beate Albrecht (née Rabich; 23 May 1921 – 2017) was a German violinist and music educator.

== Biography ==
Beate Rabich was born in Gotha on 23 May 1921. She received her first practical piano lessons from Kurt Johnen in Berlin, her theory lessons following his "Allgemeinen Musiklehre". She completed her studies at the Dresden Conservatory with a focus on violin, piano, recorder - encounter with the tonic-do teaching. This was followed by a teaching position at the Pedagogical Institute and Kindergarten Seminar in Dresden and violin studies with Walter Hansmann (1875-1963) in Erfurt. Afterward, she became a private music teacher in Gotha and devoted herself to concert activities. After her marriage and her move to Sandershausen, she became a music teacher and private music teacher for violin, recorder, and piano. Albrecht died in Dresden in 2017.

== Music education ==
Albrecht developed a concept of solmisation: laying down notes instead of writing notes. The graphic representation of notes makes the structure and regularity of tone systems comprehensible and promotes the learning process. The syllables of relative solmisation lead the student to consciously grasp the tonal relationships and interval tensions, to experience and appreciate the gradual character of the tones. She recorded her methodological experiences with relative solmisation in music lessons and used her findings to develop teaching aids and accompanying materials for music lessons. Relative solmisation has become a proven method for helping children to make the transition from an intuitive to a rational understanding of music - especially musical notation.

== Publications ==
- Töne, Lagen, Griffbrett. Verlag Merseburger, Kassel 1985
- Singen mit der Silbenfibel. Verlag Merseburger, Kassel 1987
- Silbenfibel für Violine. Verlag Merseburger, Kassel 1987
- Noten legen – mehr als ein Spiel. Verlag Merseburger, Kassel 1990
- Durch Greifen – begreifen. Do, re, mi auf Tasteninstrumenten. Verlag Merseburger, Kassel 1995
- Ohne Mühe die Noten erleben. Verlag Merseburger, Kassel 2001
- Electronic-Commerce in der kaufmännischen Berufsausbildung Zwischenbericht.
