= Otto Riemer =

German music historian and music critic

Otto Moritz Martin Riemer (2 September 1902 – 26 June 1977) was a German music historian and music critic.

== Life ==
Riemer was born in Badeleben (Landkreis Haldensleben, Province of Saxony) near Magdeburg, the son of a pastor. After attending the Domgymnasium Magdeburg (1913-1921), he studied musicology, education and philosophy at the universities of Marburg, Leipzig and Halle. He listened to Hermann Stephani, Nicolai Hartmann, Heinz Heimsoeth, Hermann Abert, Friedrich Blume, Felix Krueger, Hans Joachim Moser, Paul Menzer, Theodor Ziehen and Ottomar Wichmann, among others. From 1924 to 1926, he studied at the Leipzig Conservatory, where Carl Adolf Martienssen (piano) and Fritz Reuter (theory) were among his teachers. In Halle, he took singing lessons with Hans Klemann. In 1927, he was trained by Arnold Schering awarded a doctorate Dr. phil. at the University of Halle-Wittenberg with the dissertation Erhard Bodenschatz und sein Florilegium Portense .

From 1929 to 1933, he worked as a music critic in Görlitz. He then became a teacher of history of music at the music teachers' seminar in Magdeburg. He also continued to work as a music critic. Riemer soon acted as a music advisor for the Magdeburg region and as a municipal music commissioner. From 1937 to 1943, he was head of the cultural department in the People's Education Office of the city of Magdeburg. Furthermore, he was chairman of the state examination commission for private music teachers. In 1943, he was drafted into the Wehrmacht.

From 1949, he worked as a music critic in Heidelberg. In 1954, he became a lecturer in music history at the Musikhochschule. In 1962, he received a lectureship at the Ruprecht-Karls-Universität Heidelberg. He was also a member of the Gesellschaft für Musikforschung.

Riemer was married and father of a son. He died in Waibstadt at the age of 74.

== Publications ==
- Erhard Bodenschatz und sein Florilegium Portense. Fr. Kistner & C. F. W. Siegel, Leipzig 1928.
- Musik und Musiker in Magdeburg. Ein geschichtlicher Überblick über Magdeburgs Beitrag zur deutschen Musik. Heinrichshofensche Buchhandlung, Magdeburg 1937.
- (ed.): Weg und Werk. Eine Festgabe zum 70. Geburtstag von Prof. Dr. Hermann Meinhard Poppen. Hochstein, Heidelberg 1955.
- Chorklang im Zeitgeist. Eine Studie zum 75-jährigen Bestehen des Heidelberger Bach-Vereins. Bachverein, Heidelberg 1960.
- Einführung in die Geschichte der Musikerziehung (Taschenbücher zur Musikwissenschaft. 4 ). Heinrichshofen, Wilhelmshaven 1970, ISBN 3-7959-0021-2 (3rd edition 1983).
