= Kurt Johnen =

German pianist, music educator and musicologist

Kurt Johnen (3 January 1884 – 26 February 1965) was a German pianist, music educator and musicologist.

== Life ==
Born in Burtscheid, Johnen attended the Gymnasium in Aachen and studied musicology at the Humboldt-Universität zu Berlin and piano with Rudolf Maria Breithaupt from 1904 . From 1908 until 1911, he was assistant of Rudolf Maria Breithaupt and studied at the Berlin University of the Arts. He then worked as a music teacher and piano accompanist. From 1922 to 1924, he also taught in Amsterdam, and in 1925 he began to work as a researcher at the psychotechnical laboratory of the Technische Hochschule in Charlottenburg (now Technische Universität Berlin). In 1927, he was awarded a doctorate (Dr. phil.) with the thesis Neue Wege zur Energetik des Klavierspiels. Afterwards, he did research at the Psychological Institute of the University of Berlin. In his scientific work, he was mainly concerned with occupational diseases of pianists, the psychology of music and especially with the connection between rhythm and phrasing and physiological processes such as breathing and pulse.

In 1927, Johnen founded a music teachers' seminar, which he ran until 1945. In 1942 the seminar was merged with the Klindworth-Scharwenka Conservatory. Students of Kurt Johnen in Berlin included Marian Anderson. (1931) and at the piano Beate Albrecht and Curt Sachs.

In 1945, Johnen moved from Berlin to Quedlinburg. There, he founded a municipal conservatory in the Haus Grünhagen together with his wife from their own funds, which became the state conservatory Sachsen-Anhalt in 1949. One of his students in Quedlinburg was Tilo Medek (1959 to 1962). From 1952, he had a lectureship for music at the Staatliche Hochschule für Theater und Musik Halle and from 1955 a teaching position for the treatment of professionally ill pianists at the Hochschule für Musik "Hanns Eisler".

One of Johnen's most famous works is the Allgemeine Musiklehre, first published in 1937. Since then, several editions have been published. The 11th edition was published in 1964 shortly before his death. From the 12th edition on it was first edited and published by Eberhardt Klemm, the 15th edition was newly edited by Carlferdinand Zech. The 24th edition was published in 2018.

== Publications ==
- Neue Wege zur Energetik des Klavierspiels. Dissertation. Universität Berlin 1927. H. J. Paris, Amsterdam 1927, DNB-IDN 574143165.
- Allgemeine Musiklehre. Reclam, Leipzig 1937, DNB-IDN 580294943
- with Hildegard Städing: Der Anfang im Klavierspiel. Rhythmisch geordnetes Spielgut aufgebaut. 2nd edition. Mitteldeutsche Verlagsgesellschaft, Halle (Saale) 1948, DNB-IDN 1003454372.
- Wege zur Energetik des Klavierspiels. Mitteldeutscher Verlag, Halle (Saale) 1950, DNB-IDN 740496107.
- Tänze aus Bachs Zeit aus der Tanzschule von Gregorio Lambranzi. Eingerichtet von Kurt Johnen und Gertrud Wierzejewski. Mitteldeutscher Verlag, Halle (Saale) 1950, DNB-IDN 1003454887. Neuauflagen: Hofmeister, Leipzig 1973, 1978, 1982, 1986.

Editor

- Carl Philipp Emanuel Bach: Sonaten. Mitteldeutscher Verlag, Halle (Saale) 1951, DNB-IDN 1000350274.
- Carl Philipp Emanuel Bach: Sechs Sonatinen für Klavier. Mitteldeutscher Verlag, Halle (Saale) 1951, DNB-IDN 350689636.
- Carl Philipp Emanuel Bach: Sechs Sonaten. Mitteldeutscher Verlag, Halle (Saale) 1951, DNB-IDN 1000351955.
- with Gertrud Wierzejewski: Carl Philipp Emanuel Bach: Zwölf zwei- und dreistimmige kleine Stücke (1770). Mitteldeutscher Verlag, Halle (Saale) 1953, DNB-IDN 1000341461.
