= Günter Bust =

German music educator and composer

Günter Bust (12 July 1930 – 27 May 2005) was a German music educator and composer.

== Life ==
Born in Ottersleben, today Magdeburg, Bust first attended the 23rd Magdeburg Community School, then the Musische Gymnasium Leipzig from 1941 to 1945. After the Bombing of Leipzig, the school was evacuated to Nossen in 1943/44. At the end of the war, he stayed in Zschopau.

After the Abitur at the Domgymnasium Magdeburg, he studied school music with Fritz Reuter and Slavic studies at the Martin Luther University of Halle-Wittenberg from 1949 to 1953. On the occasion of the Deutschlandtreffen der Jugend in East Berlin in 1950, he founded the "Central Choir" which is considered the forerunner of the Hochschulchor "Johann Friedrich Reichardt" in Halle.

Bust then worked as a teacher in Halberstadt and Dessau. From 1956 to 1963, he was head of the music department at the Institute for Teacher Education in Weißenfels. Afterwards, he taught at the Käthe Kollwitz secondary school in Schönebeck.

From 1967 to 1995 he was head of the Conservatory Georg Philipp Telemann, where he taught music theory, practical school play and viola. He also presided over the youth symphony orchestra there. At the music school, he set up a secretariat for the "Georg Philipp Telemann" working group. This became the centre of Telemann care and research in 1985. Bust also installed a musical pre-school education. Furthermore, he made Magdeburg the venue for the chamber music competition of the GDR. In 1976, he created a composer class at the music school.

In 1974, he inaugurated the first new carillon in the GDR on the tower of the Rathaus Magdeburg. In 1978, he was involved in setting up the Magdeburg branch of the University of Music and Theatre Leipzig. From 1990 onwards, he was a lecturer at the Institute of Music at the Otto von Guericke University Magdeburg. He taught practical school playing, basso continuo and score playing. He was also a co-founder of the Saxony-Anhalt Association of Music Schools, the Landesmusikrat Sachsen-Anhalt, the Saxony-Anhalt Association of German Musicians and the Saxony-Anhalt State Music Festival.

Bust was violist of the König String Quartet Magdeburg. He also played in the Magdeburg Chamber Orchestra and the Academic Orchestra of Otto von Guericke University Magdeburg, which he conducted from 1997 to 2001. He was also active as an arranger and composer.

In 2005 he was awarded the Telemann-Pokal of the Telemann-Arbeitskreis.

Bust died in Schönebeck at the age of 74.
