= Assen Najdenow =

Bulgarian conductor

Assen Najdenow (Bulgarian: Асен Найденов; 12 September 1899 – 10 September 1995) was a Bulgarian conductor.

== Life ==
Najdenov was born in 1899 in Varna on the Black Sea. In his childhood, he learned the violin and the piano. In 1905, his uncle brought a grand piano from Russia. As a pupil, he already played in the city orchestra as a violinist from 1912 to 1914. In 1920, he studied composition in Vienna with Joseph Marx and piano with Paul de Conne. In 1921, he went to Leipzig, where among others, Fritz Reuter was one of his teachers. Max Hochkofler taught him conducting.

Back in Bulgaria, he made his debut in 1925 with Mignon by Ambroise Thomas at the National Opera and Ballet of Bulgaria in Sofia. In 1930, he attended courses with Bruno Walter and Clemens Krauss in Salzburg. In 1944, he became chief conductor in Sofia. Guest conducting engagements took him to the Berlin State Opera (Mussorgsky's Khovanshchina in 1958), to Leningrad Mikhailovsky Theatre (Kirill Molchanov's Romeo, Juliet a tma 1962/63) and to the Moscow Bolshoi Theatre (Verdi's Don Carlos 1963/64).

Najdenow specialised in particular in the operas of Mozart, Mussorgsky and Verdi.

== Death ==
He died in Sofia shortly before his 96th birthday.

== Awards ==
- Dimitroff Prize – Gold/1st Class (1950, 1952, 1959
- People's Artist of the People's Republic of Bulgaria (1952)
- Hero of Socialist Labour of the People's Republic of Bulgaria
- Order of Georgi Dimitrov
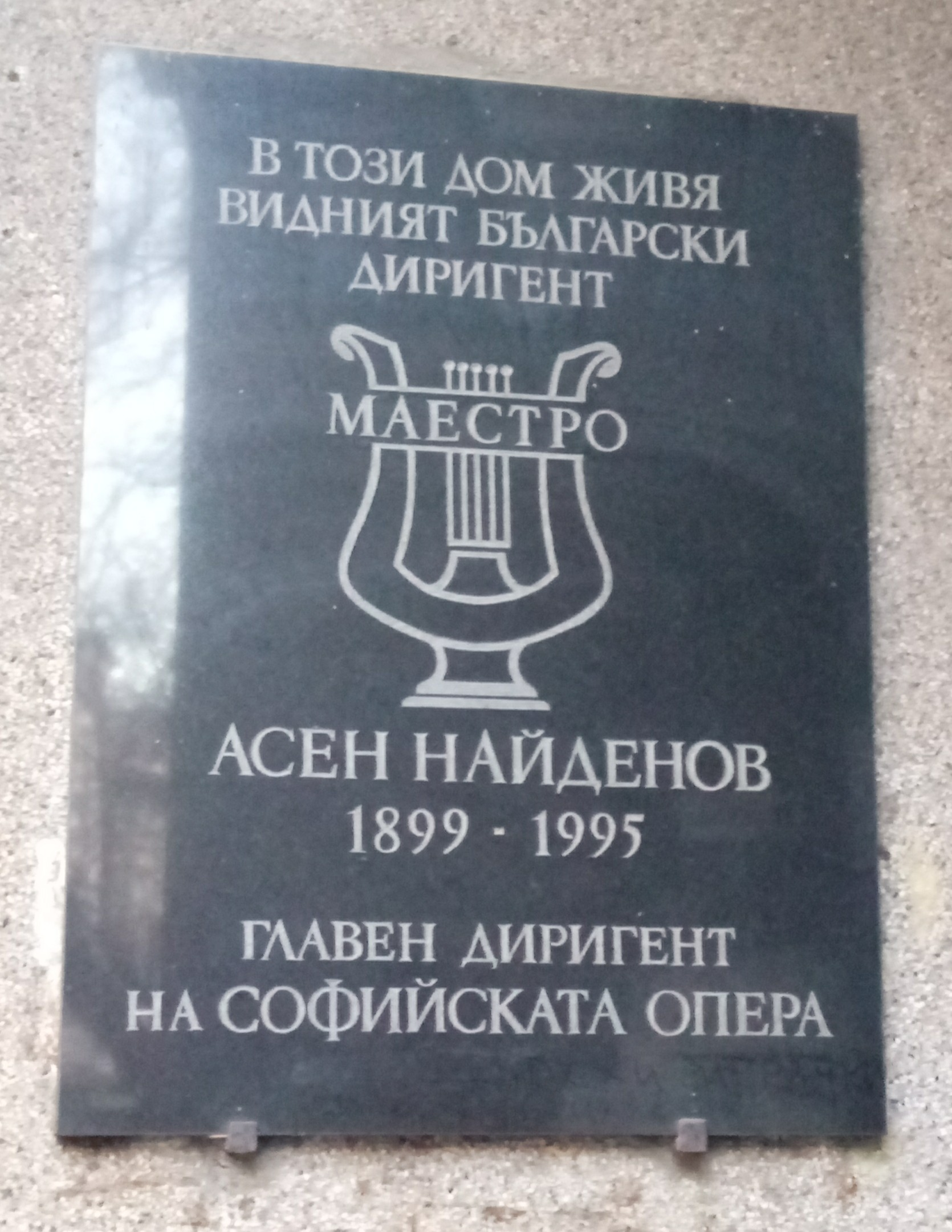
- Memorial plaque for Assen Naidenow in Sofia
  Order of the People's Republic of Bulgaria – 1st Degree
