= Richard Münnich =

German musicologist and music pedagogue

Richard Karl Emil Münnich (7 June 1877 – 4 July 1970) was a German musicologist and music pedagogue.

== Life ==
Born in Berlin, Münnich studied musicology, Germanistic and philosophy at the Humboldt University of Berlin and gained his doctorate in 1902 with a dissertation about Johann Kuhnau's life. Between 1902 and 1905 he worked on the Jacob Obrecht complete edition and the Denkmälern deutscher Tonkunst. From 1904 to 1908 he taught music history at the Hugo Riemann Conservatory in Berlin, then piano from 1908, music theory and ear training at the Klindworth-Scharwenka Conservatory there.

At the suggestion of Georg Rolle, Münnich also took up a position as a singing and music teacher at a Berlin secondary school in 1908, where he was permanently employed from 1913 to 1934 and increasingly gained influence in the field of music education. As one of the first student councilors for music in 1924, he became a member of the examination offices a year later and in 1927 he was the director of the first specialist seminar for school music trainees. At the same time he participated in the publication of the Monatsschrift für Schulmusikpflege (1918-1921) and the Zeitschrift für Schulmusik (1928-1934).

At the same time, Münnich, who had founded the Association of Academically Educated Music Teachers of Prussia in 1918, was intensively involved in school policy: in 1920 he was a participant in the Reichsschulkonferenz, in 1924/25 he was a commissioner for the Hans Richert school reform and from 1928 to 1932 expert advisor for school music in the Berlin Ministry. In 1934 Münnich, who had also worked at the Berlin Academy for Church and School Music from 1929 to 1933, retired and moved to Naumburg. In 1935 he was appointed professor of musicology at the Hochschule für Musik Franz Liszt, Weimar, where he also became director of the Institute for School Music three years later (until 1947).

Since Münnich kept silent about his National Socialist German Workers' Party membership (since 1932, before that since 1919 DVP), he retained his position after the war and even took over as head of the musicology department from early 1948 to mid-1949. After his retirement in 1949, Münnich remained a lecturer until 1964. In 1957 he was appointed honorary senator.

Münnich died in Weimar at the age of 93.

== Importance ==
Although not uncontroversial, Münnich was the practical representative in the school music reforms of the 1920s (Leo Kestenberg reforms), especially as co-author of the 1925 guidelines, which were exemplary for all German states, in a tone syllable system called Jale. In 1930), he succeeded in combining the advantages of the Agnes Hundoegger's Tonika-Do-Teachings and solmization. The major scale was called ja, le, mi, ni, ro, su, wa, ja; by changing the vowels and consonants to a complete chromaticism system. This system was used in music lessons in the German Democratic Republic. Münnich's versatility as a music teacher in schools, as a training lecturer in the first and second phase of teaching, and as a specialist politician made him a "picture-book school musician" for the secondary schools. In the 1950s and 1960s, through his students Albrecht Krauß (1914-1989) and Helmut Großmann (1914-2001), he became an absolute role model for Weimar school music.

== Publication ==
- Richard Münnich: JALE. Ein Beitrag zur Tonsilbenfrage und zur Schulmusikpropädeutik, Lahr 1930
