= Bernhard Porst =

German Kappellmeister and music educator

Bernhard Porst (8 April 1857 – 1926) was a German Kapellmeister and music educator.

== Life ==
Porst came from the capital and royal seat of Weimar (Saxe-Weimar-Eisenach). There he first attended the Grand Ducal Lehrerseminar. From 1873 to 1876, he was at Carl Müllerhartung's Orchesterschule. As one of his most advanced piano students, he was privileged to participate in the lessons of Franz Liszt.

After his education, he became a music house teacher for the children of the Landgrave of Hesse. For a time, he lived in Holstein for this purpose. Porst then worked at the theatre in Stettin. After his military service he went to the theatre in Danzig.

In 1883 he came to Leipzig as music director of the municipal theatre, where he was responsible for operetta and Spieloper. As second Kapellmeister, he then stood on the podium alongside Richard Hagel and Egon Pollak. Later he also worked as a concert conductor. In 1918, the Elberfeld Kapellmeister Hans Knappertsbusch succeeded him, having previously retired for health reasons. From 1907 to 1925, as Heinrich Klesse's successor, he was director of the "Opera School". at the University of Music and Theatre Leipzig.

From 1886, Porst was married to the soprano Ottilie Andes (1864–1909).

== Awards ==
In 1905, he was awarded the Verdienstkreuz für Kunst und Wissenschaft (Reuß) by Heinrich XXVII the hereditary prince of the Principality of Reuss-Gera.
