= Georg Trexler =

German composer

Georg Max Trexler (February 9, 1903 in Pirna – December 15, 1979 in Leipzig) was a German composer.

Originally a student of economics at the University of Leipzig, he switched to music under the influence of Karl Straube, and became a choirmaster and organist at the St. Trinitatis church in Leipzig in 1930, continuing his work there for forty years.

He started teaching organ and conducting at the conservatory in 1935; he was drafted as a soldier in 1940, and ended the war as a US prisoner of war, before returning to Leipzig and the university.

Pope Paul VI awarded him the Order of St. Sylvester in 1967 for his contributions to Catholic music.
