= Hartmut Krones =

Austrian musicologist

Hartmut Krones (born 15 October 1944) is an Austrian musicologist.

== Training ==
Born in Vienna, Krones studied German language and literature at the University of Vienna as well as music education, vocal pedagogy and Lied and Oratorio at the University of Music and Performing Arts Vienna. He also won a doctorate in musicology.

== Research and teaching ==
Since 1970 Krones had been teaching at the University of Music and Performing Arts Vienna and was appointed full professor and head of the teaching office Musikalische Stilkunde und Aufführungspraxis in 1987. Since 1996, he has also been heading the Arnold-Schönberg-Institute of this university. In October 2013 Krones retired. Among the focal points of his work as author and editor of numerous publications are historical performance practice, musical symbolism and music of the 20th century. Krones is concerned with identifying meanings in music. Critics have commented critically on his approach, saying that Krones confuses "the musical expression of feelings with programme music".

== Functions in Austrian musical life ==
Since 1968, Hartmut Krones has been writing the introductory texts for the program booklets of the Wiener Musikverein Furthermore, he is a member of the Board of Trustees of the Arnold Schönberg Center and Chairman of the Egon-Wellesz-Fonds at the Society of Friends of Music in Vienna.

== Publications ==
- An: Karl Steiner, Shanghai: Briefe ins Exil an einen Pianisten der Wiener Schule, Verlag: Böhlau Wien; ISBN 3-205-78361-1
- Alte Musik und Musikpädagogik, Verlag: Böhlau Wien; ISBN 3205988213
- Struktur und Freiheit in der Musik des 20. Jahrhunderts, Verlag: Böhlau Wien; ISBN 3205770668
- Jean Sibelius und Wien, Verlag: Böhlau Wien; ISBN 3205771419
- Bühne, Film, Raum und Zeit in der Musik des 20. Jahrhunderts. Wiener Schriften zur Stilkunde und Aufführungspraxis, Publishing house: Böhlau Wien; ISBN 3205772067
- Die österreichische Symphonie im 20. Jahrhundert, Verlag: Böhlau Wien; ISBN 3205772075
- Multikulturelle und internationale Konzepte in der Neuen Musik, Verlag: Böhlau Wien; ISBN 3205775015
- Anton Webern, Verlag: Böhlau Wien; ISBN 3205990722
- Stimme und Wort in der Musik des 20. Jahrhunderts, Verlag: Böhlau Wien; ISBN 320599387X
- Arnold Schönberg: Werk und Leben, Hartmut Krones und Reingard Grübl-Steinbauer, Edition Steinbauer Wien; ISBN 3902494034
- Ludwig van Beethoven, with CD-Audio. Verlag Holzhausen Wien; ISBN 385493002X
- Vokale und allgemeine Aufführungspraxis, Verlag: Böhlau Wien; ISBN 3205083717
- Marcel Rubin, Verlag Elisabeth Lafite Wien, ISBN 3-215-02116-1

== Awards ==
- Julia Bungardt, Maria Helfgott, Eike Rathgeber, Nikolaus Urbanek: Wiener Musikgeschichte: Annäherungen – Analysen – Ausblicke; Festschrift für Hartmut Krones, Verlag: Böhlau, Vienna, Cologne, Weimar 2009
