= Eugenie Sendrey =

Austrian opera singer

Eugenie Sendrey (20 August 1884 in Vienna – 27 November 1959) also Eugenie Szendrei (wedding name), Eugenie Weisz (birth name) and Eugenie Wilms (stage name), was an American soprano of Austrian-Hungarian origin who worked under her birth name Eugenie Weisz at the Vienna State Opera under Gustav Mahler. Sendrey was the wife of the composer, conductor and musicologist Alfred Szendrei (later Alfred Sendrey) and the mother of the composer and arranger Albert Richard Sendrey. One of her siblings was the violinist, conductor and composer Paul Weiss (1888–1967, originally Paul Weisz).

Sendrey was born in Vienna in 1884 as the daughter of Leopold Weisz and his wife Franciska, née Frankel. She grew up in Vienna with four siblings. Sendrey fled as a Jew around 1933 with her family from the National Socialists, first to Paris. The battle of France in May and June 1940 forced the family to continue fleeing to the United States. There she changed her Hungarian surname "Szendrei" to the Americanized spelling "Sendrey". Sendrey's mother Franciska was deported to the Theresienstadt Ghetto in August 1942 and died there on 31 December 1942. Her father had already died in 1921.

Sendrey died in Los Angeles at age 76.
