= Agnes Hundoegger =

German musician and music educator

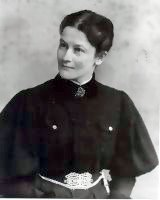
Agnes Hundoegger

Agnes Hundoegger (26 February 1858 – 23 February 1927) was a German musician and music teacher. As the founder of the Tonika-Do-Lehre, she rendered outstanding services to the elementary musical education.

== Life ==
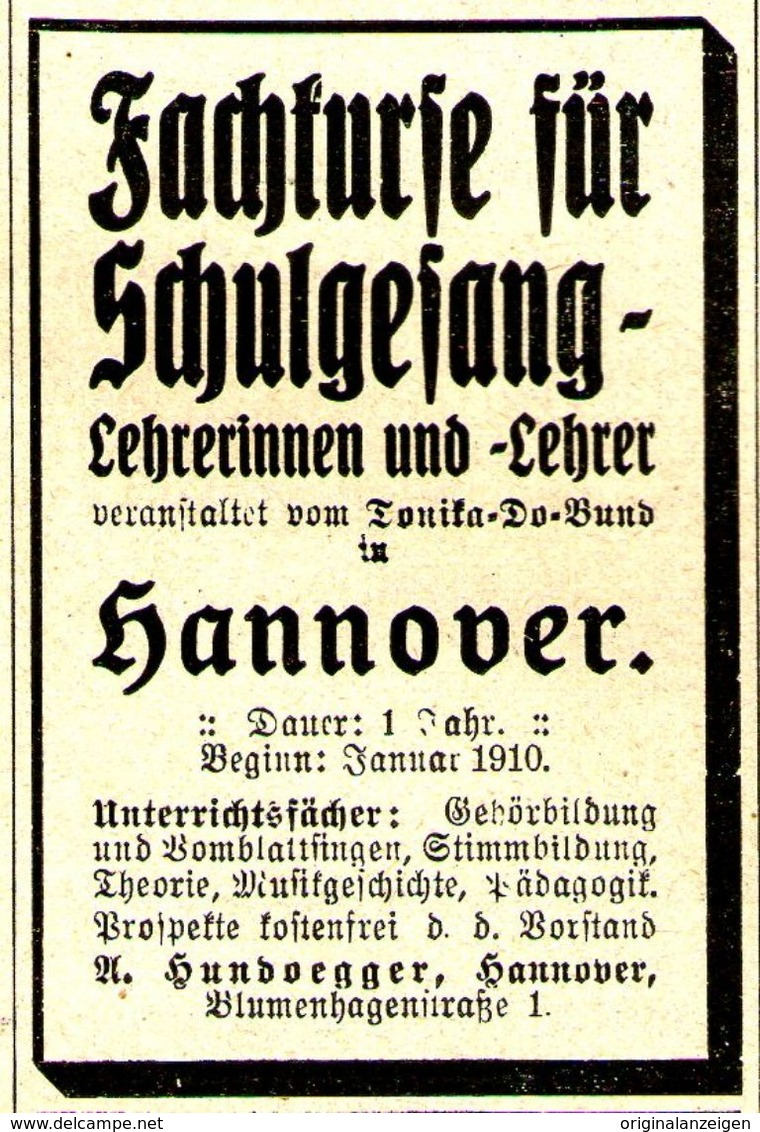
Announcement of the Tonika-Do-Bundes (Hannover), end 1909

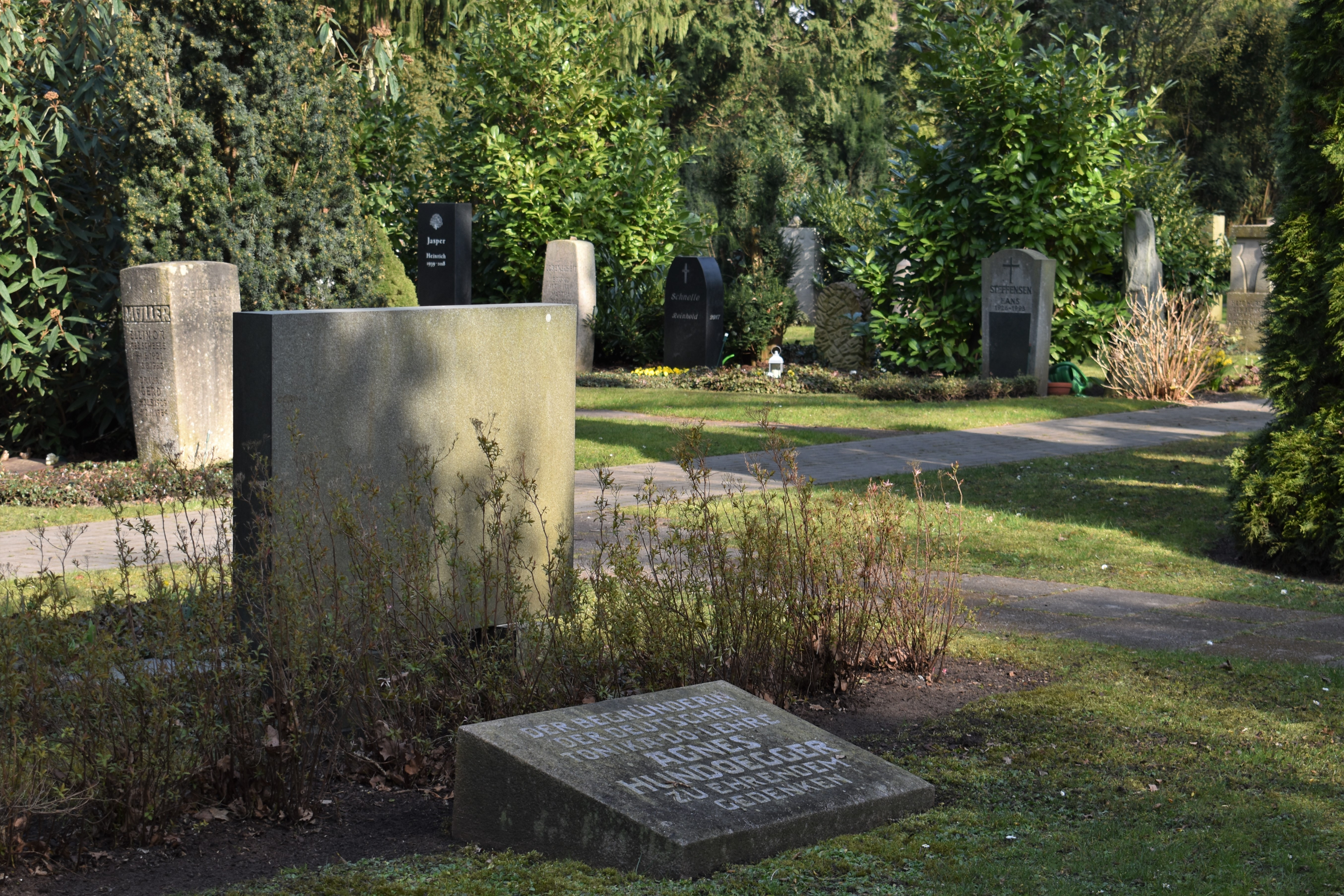
Memorial stone for Agnes Hundoegger at the city cemetery Engesohde in Hanover

Born in Hannover, Hundoegger grew up in a Bildungsbürgertum (educated middle class) influenced parental home; her father was chief physician of the municipal hospital of Hanover. The child's musical talent was discovered and encouraged early on. At the age of sixteen Hundoegger began studying music at the Universität der Künste Berlin in Charlottenburg; her singing teacher was Elise Breiderhoff, her piano teacher Ernst Rudorff. After graduating in 1881 "with special distinction" in both subjects, she continued her vocal training in Frankfurt with Julius Stockhausen.

Afterwards Hundoegger worked as a pianist, oratorio and lied singer, piano and singing teacher in her hometown Hannover. In 1896 she got to know the Tonic sol-fa system, first through textbooks, then in a holiday course of the Tonic sol-fa Association near London.

The impressions and experiences of the one month in which I felt part of this great community there have marked a turning point in my life and my professional activity. With embarrassment, I soon had to pack up my German musical arrogance. It was not at all a question of personal artistic achievement, but of the ability to adapt to a given subject and class level and to solve a task with pedagogical understanding. Agnes Hundoegger.

At home, Hundoegger immediately began to try out the new experiences with groups of children. As with John Curwen, the founder of the tonic-sol-fa system, Hundoegger's lessons focused on singing tone sequences and songs with the help of solmisation syllables and hand signals. In some points she modified the British concept. For example, Curwen had adopted the counting of the Galin-Paris-Chevé system, but instead of the corresponding bar notation, she developed her own "signs that are not always easy to recognize by the eye"; Hundoegger went back to the French bar notation. Already in 1897 she presented the result by publishing her Guide to the Tonic-Do Method for School Use. As the purpose of the guideline she stated "to make available to German musicians and school singing teachers a method by which children, even without a particular natural disposition, learn to read and sing any melody correctly and just intonation from the page in a relatively short time".

In 1909 Hundoegger founded the Tonika-Do-Bund and the Tonika-Do-Verlag to promote the dissemination of the Tonika-Do doctrine and to intensify the internal exchange of ideas. In 1923, four years before her death, she was able to state that the "tonic-do cause [...] had grown from a small seed, without any loud propaganda, with quiet continuity into a strong stem".

Hundoegger died in Hannover at age 68. She was buried at the Stadtfriedhof Engesohde. Her grave is located in the department '30', grave number '1023-1024'.

== Work ==
- Leitfaden der Tonika-Do-Methode für den Schulgebrauch (1897)
- Leitfaden der Tonika-Do-Lehre, 2nd edition of the 1897 guide (1908)
- 100 Kanons für die sangesfreudige Jugend in Noten und Tonika-Do-Schrift (1925)
- Übungsbuch zum Leitfaden der Tonika-Do-Lehre (1926)
- Alte, altmodige und neuere ein- und zweistimmige Lieder (1927)
- Tonika-Do-Quartettspiel (1927)
