= Alfred Szendrei =

American composer of Hungarian birth (1884–1976)

Alfred Szendrei (29 February 1884 – 3 March 1976), also Alfred Sendrey and Aladár Szendrei, was an American musicologist, organist, conductor, and composer of Hungarian origin. He was one of the leading conductors and pioneers of German radio. In exile he changed his Hungarian surname "Szendrei" to the Americanized spelling "Sendrey".

== Life and career ==
Szendrei was born in 1884 to a Hungarian middle-class family in Budapest (Austria-Hungary); his father was a civil servant. From the age of six he learned to play the piano. At the request of his parents, he first studied jurisprudence at the Corvinus University of Budapest. From 1900 to 1905 he studied music with Hans Koessler at the university and Franz Liszt Academy of Music in Budapest. Afterwards he worked as Kapellmeister and répétiteur at the Cologne Opera (1905–07), in Mulhouse (1907–09), Brünn (1908–11), Philadelphia and Chicago (1911–12), at the Hamburg State Opera (1912–13), New York City (1913–14), Berlin (1914–16) and Vienna (1916–18). During the First World War he served in the Austro-Hungarian army. In 1931 he received his doctorate from the Leipzig University with his dissertation Rundfunk und Musikpflege (Radio and Music Studies) and graduated with a doctorate in musicology.

From 1918 onwards he worked in Leipzig, from 1924 as Kapellmeister at the Leipzig Opera. In the same year he became music director of the Mitteldeutsche Rundfunk AG. He was also first conductor of the MDR Sinfonieorchester. Due to the growing anti-Semitism he lost this position in 1931 because of his Jewish descent. He had previously been denounced by the musicologists Herbert Gerigk and Theophil Stengel among others. From 1931 to 1933 he was music director of the Berliner Rundfunk and teacher at the Klindworth-Scharwenka Conservatory in Berlin. After his emigration to France, he worked from 1933 to 1940 as program director at Radiodiffusion nationale in Paris.

When the Germans attacked France in May and June 1939, he fled to the United States. There he changed his name to "Sendrey". He first worked as a translator for the United States Department of State. Later he was invited by Abraham Binder to the Jewish community center 92nd Street YMHA in New York City. From 1944 to 1952 he was a professor at Westlake College of Music in Los Angeles. From 1952 to 1956 he was music director of the Fairfax Synagogue and from 1950 to 1963 music director and organist of the Sinai Temple. From 1961 he was professor of musicology (Jewish music) at the Jewish Theological Seminary of the School of Fine Arts of the American Jewish University in Los Angeles. In 1967 he was awarded the title of Honorary Doctor (Doctor of Humane Letters, Honoris Causa).

Sendrey died in 1976 in Los Angeles New Hospital at age 92. The funeral service took place with the participation of the Jewish community in the Sinai Temple in Westwood, Los Angeles.

== Family ==
Szendrei was married to the soprano singer Eugenie Weisz, who performed at the Vienna State Opera during Gustav Mahler's tenure as director. The American composer and conductor Albert Richard Sendrey is the son of the couple. Lillian Felice Fawcett-Szendrei (1912–1999) is the daughter of Alfred and Eugenie. Lillian, who later changed her name to Swanson and performed as Lillian Fawcett, was also an opera soprano who performed with the San Francisco Opera, the New York City Opera, the Paris Opera and performed at the Hollywood Bowl and the Pasadena Playhouse.

== Compositions ==
Sendrey composed several works, including operas, pieces for orchestra and chamber music, Lieder as well as liturgical songs.

== Academic work ==
- Tonkünstler und Rundfunk Wegner & Flemming, Berlin 1927
- Rundfunk und Musikpflege Kistner & Siegel, Leipzig 1931
- Dirigierkunde, Breitkopf & Härtel, Leipzig 1932 (3rd ed. 1956)
- Bibliography of Jewish Music Columbia University Press, New York 1951
- Music in Ancient Israel Philosophical Library, New York 1969; in German: Musik in Alt-Israel. Leipzig 1970
- The Music of the Jews in the Diaspora (up to 1800) T. Yoseloff, New York 1970
- Music in the Social and Religious Life of Antiquity Fairleigh Dickinson University Press, Rutherford 1974

== Students ==
- Johnny Green
- Henry Mancini
- Lyn Murray
- Nelson Riddle
- Leo Shuken
- Philip Moddel
