= Wilhelm Rischbieter =

German violinist, composer and music educator

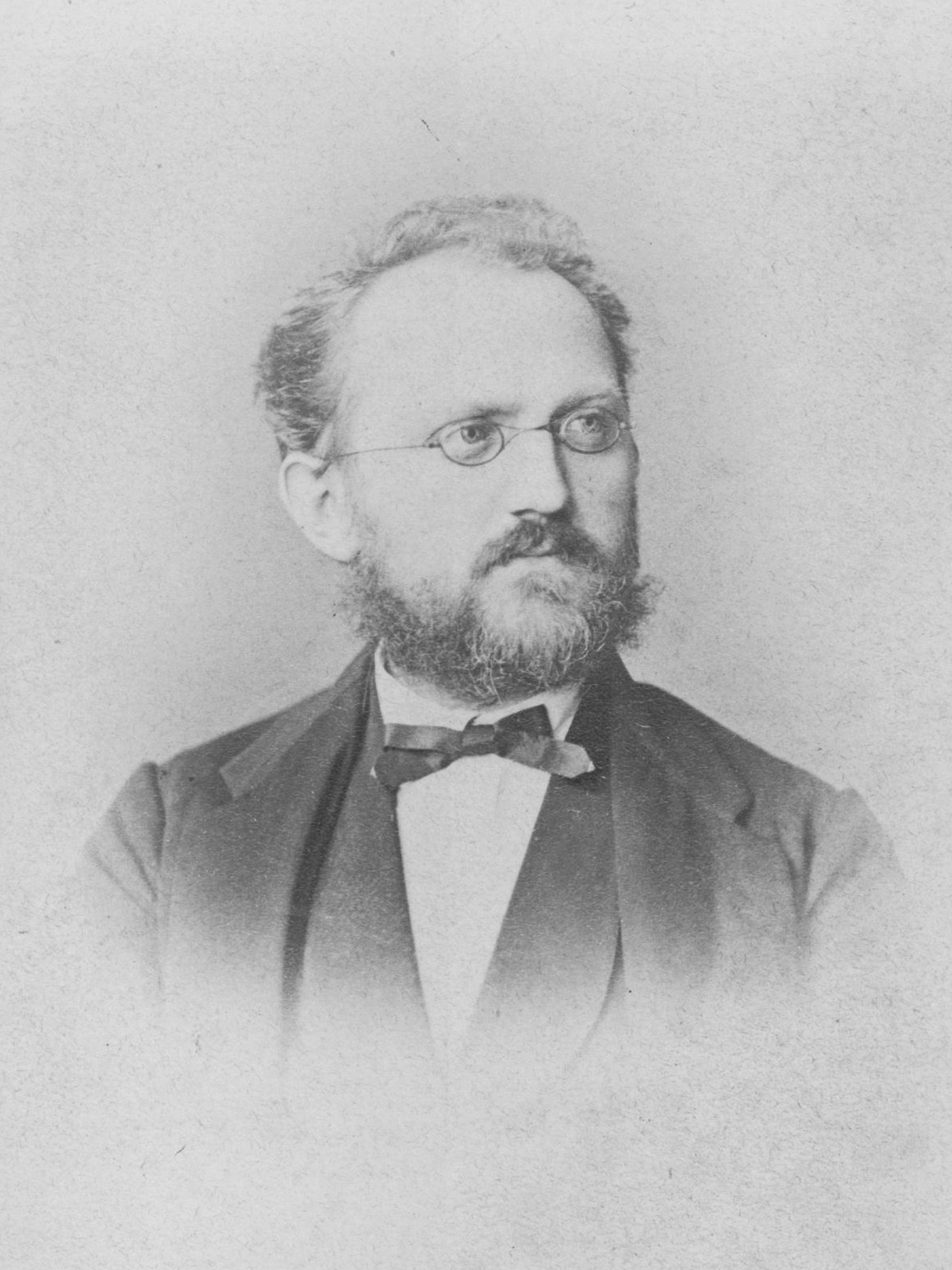
Wilhelm Rischbieter

Wilhelm Albert Rischbieter (20 July 1834 – 10 February 1910) was a German violinist, music educator, composer and docent at the royal Hochschule für Musik Carl Maria von Weber Dresden.

== Life ==
Born in Braunschweig, Rischbieter was a student of the composer and violinist Moritz Hauptmann at the Leipzig conservatory. From 1862 to 1900, he taught violin, harmony and counterpoint at the conservatory in Dresden. Notable students from his time there include the Dresden choral conductor and composer Hugo Richard Jüngst and Hermann Vetter, who later became a professor at the same institute. in the Biographisches Lexikon der Oberlausitz . Rischbieter published numerous essays on music theory written during his years as a music educator. Several articles by him were published by the Allgemeine musikalische Zeitung und die Neue Zeitschrift für Musik.

Rischbieter died in Dresden aged 75.

== Work ==
- Drei theoretische Abhandlungen über Modulation, Quartsextaccord und Orgelpunkt. F. Ries, Dresden 1879, OCLC 32986105.
- Die verdeckten Quinten. Eine theoretische Abhandlung. Hildburghausen, 1882, OCLC 504152277.
- Erläuterungen und Aufgaben zum Studium des Kontrapunkts. Ries & Erler, Berlin 1885, OCLC 603345445.
- Die Gesetzmässigkeit in der Harmonik. A. Coppenrath, Regensburg 1888, OCLC 43097007.
- Ganze und halbe Tonstufen. (Königliches Conservatorium für Musik und Theater.; Bericht des Conservatoriums für Musik und Theater zu Dresden.) Warnatz & Lehmann, Dresden 1897, OCLC 313543126.
- Der Harmonieschüler. Ries & Erler, Berlin 1903, OCLC 613022471.
  - Erläuterungen und Beispiele für Harmonieschüler. Ries & Erler, Berlin 1903, OCLC 462340447.
