= Georg Knepler =

Austrian pianist

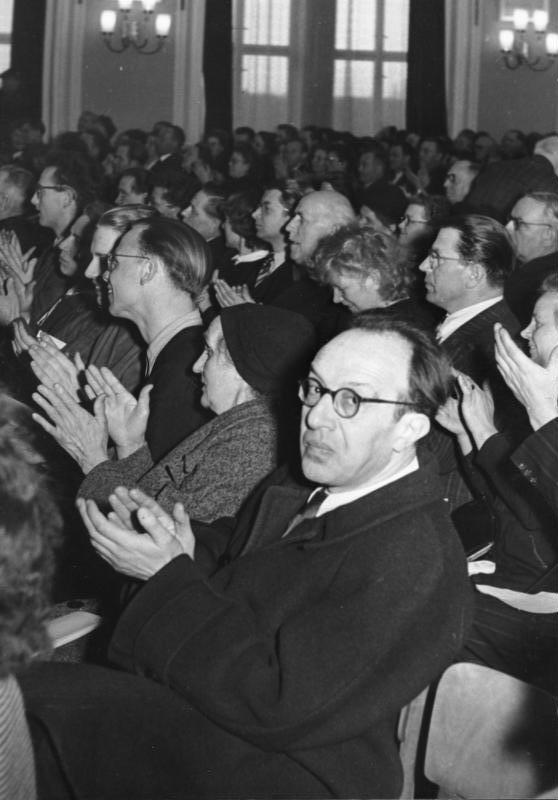
Georg Knepler, 1952

Georg Knepler (21 December 1906 – 14 January 2003) was an Austrian pianist, conductor and musicologist.

== Life ==
Born in Vienna, Knepler was a son of the composer and librettist Paul Knepler and nephew of the music publisher and impresario Hugo Knepler. He studied piano with Eduard Steuermann from 1926, conducting with Hans Gál and musicology with Guido Adler, Wilhelm Fischer, Egon Wellesz, Rudolf von Ficker and Robert Lach at the University of Vienna. In 1931 he received his doctorate with the dissertation Die Form in den Instrumentalwerken Johannes Brahms as Dr. phil. At the same time he accompanied Karl Kraus at the piano from 1928 to 1931, who performed Jacques Offenbach's operettas in Vienna, Berlin, Prague, Munich and other cities. In the same period he worked as Kapellmeister, Korrepetitor and conductor at the Wiener Volksoper and at the Wiener Stadttheater, from 1930 to 1931 in Mannheim and with Karl Rankl in Wiesbaden as well as leader of workers' choirs. The years 1932/33 are marked by the collaboration with Bertolt Brecht and Hanns Eisler. He was the piano accompanist of Helene Weigel, who sang Eisler's Wiegenlieder einer proletarischen Mutte (Lullabies of a Proletarian Mother) at workers' meetings.

From 1933 onwards, the Jew and communist Knepler was forbidden any activity and he returned to Austria. Since he had joined the banned Communist Party of Austria in Vienna in April 1933 and distributed Communist newspapers, he was arrested in January 1934, but was able to emigrate to England the same year. There he turned more and more intensively to the teachings of Karl Marx and Friedrich Engels, adopted their world view and dialectics and developed his own research work on this basis. Parallel to his musicological and journalistic work, he was active as an opera conductor as well as musical director of the emigrant theatre "Laterndl" and secretary of the "Austrian Centre".

In 1946 he went back to Vienna and took over the function of cultural adviser of the Communist Party of Austria (KPÖ). From 1949 Knepler worked in East-Berlin, where the German Democratic Republic was founded in the same year, retaining his Austrian citizenship. In 1957 he was transferred from the KPÖ to the Socialist Unity Party of Germany.

=== Teaching activity in Berlin ===
In 1950 Knepler founded the German Academy of Music Berlin, of which he became Rector, and which he directed until 1959. In 1964 it was given the name Hochschule für Musik "Hanns Eisler" in Berlin. His concept was aimed at the education of musicians and singers of "new type", who, in addition to their professional qualifications, should also actively participate in social life. From 1959 to 1970, he headed the Musicological Institute of the Humboldt University of Berlin, where he concentrated on the development of Marxist-oriented teaching and research in response to bourgeois musicology. In 1964 Knepler became a full member of the German Academy of Sciences at Berlin.

Knepler died on 14 January 2003 in the hospital of Köpenick at age 96, leaving behind his wife Florence Knepler (1910-2011), née Wiles.

== Awards ==
- 1960 Vaterländischer Verdienstorden in Bronze
- 1962 Nationalpreis der DDR
- 1971 Banner der Arbeit
- 1976 Vaterländischer Verdienstorden in Gold
- 1981 Stern der Völkerfreundschaft in Gold
- 1986 Ehrenspange zum Vaterländischen Verdienstorden in Gold

== Work ==
- Musikgeschichte des 19. Jahrhunderts. Berlin 1961.
- Geschichte als Weg zum Musikverständnis. Zur Theorie, Methode und Geschichte der Musikgeschichtsschreibung. Leipzig 1977, 2. überarbeitete Fassung 1982.
- Gedanken über Musik. Reden, Versuche, Aufsätze, Kritiken. Berlin 1980.
- Karl Kraus liest Offenbach. Berlin 1984.
- Wolfgang Amadé Mozart, Annäherungen. Berlin 1991; New edition 2005.

- Mozart in seiner Zeit und in der unseren. Auszug aus dem letzten Kapitel von "Wolfgang Amadeus Mozart – Annäherungen. In Zwischenwelt. Zeitschrift für Kultur des Exils und des Widerstands. Jg. 19, Nr. 4; Vienna February 2003, ISSN 1606-4321, pp. 36–38.

- Macht ohne Herrschaft. Die Realisierung einer Möglichkeit. Kai Homilius Verlag, Berlin 2004, ISBN 3-89706-651-3.

== Literature ==
- Bernd-Rainer Barth: Knepler, Georg in Wer war wer in der DDR? 5th edition. Vol. 1, Ch. Links, Berlin 2010, ISBN 978-3-86153-561-4
- Susanne Blumesberger, Michael Doppelhofer, Gabriele Mauthe: Handbuch österreichischer Autorinnen und Autoren jüdischer Herkunft 18. bis 20. Jahrhundert. Vol. 2: J–R. Edit. by der Österreichischen Nationalbibliothek. Saur, Munich 2002, ISBN 3-598-11545-8, p. 696.
- Oesterreichisches Musiklexikon. Vol. 3. publishing house of the Austrian Academy of Sciences, Vienna 2004, ISBN 3-7001-3045-7, p. 1081.
- Renate Göllner & Gerhard Scheit: „… bestünde Lieb' und Bruderbund“ – Georg Knepler zum Gedächtnis. Ein Nachruf. In Zwischenwelt. Zeitschrift für Kultur des Exils und des Widerstands. Jg. 19, Nr. 4; Vienna February 2003, ISSN 1606-4321, pp. 27–28.
- Gerhard Scheit: Also Raunzen können die Engländer überhaupt nicht. From an interview with Georg Knepler on resistance, anti-Semitism and exile (conducted by G. Scheit on 2 and 3 May 1992 in Berlin-Grünau). In Zwischenwelt. Zeitschrift für Kultur des Exils und des Widerstands. Jg. 19, Nr. 4; Vienna February 2003, ISSN 1606-4321, pp. 28–35.
- Golan Gur: The Other Marxism: Georg Knepler and the Anthroplogy of Music. In Musicologia Austriaca. May, 2016, Article
- Anne C. Shreffler: Berlin Walls: Dahlhaus, Knepler, and Ideologies of Music History. In Journal of Musicology. Autumn, 2003, Vol. 20, No. 4, pp. 498–525, Abstract (Englisch)
- Gerhard Oberkofler: Über das musikwissenschaftliche Studium von Georg Knepler an der Wiener Universität. Eine archivalische Notiz zu seinem hundertsten Geburtstag. Communications of the Alfred Klahr Society, Nr. 3/2006.
- Knepler, Georg. In Brockhaus-Riemann Musiklexikon. CD-Rom, Directmedia Publishing, Berlin 2004, ISBN 3-89853-438-3, p. 5408.
- Gerhard Oberkofler und Manfred Mugrauer: Georg Knepler. Musikwissenschaftler und marxistischer Denker aus Wien [Brochured]. StudienVerlag Wien / Innsbruck 2014
