= Staatsexamen =

National exam system in Germany

The Staatsexamen ("state examination" or "exam by state"; pl.: Staatsexamina) is a German government licensing examination that future physicians, dentists, physical therapists, teachers, research librarians, archivists, pharmacists, food chemists, psychotherapists, jurists (i.e., lawyers, judges, public prosecutors, civil-law notaries), and surveyors have to pass to be allowed to work in their profession. The examination is generally organized by government examination agencies which are under the authority of the responsible ministry. These agencies create examination commissions which consist of members of the examination agency, university professors and/or representatives from the professions. The Staatsexamina are considered first professional degrees and in some cases legally equivalent to a doctorate degree in the respective operating ranges.

== Overview ==
Graduating Staatsexamen is mostly, but not always, separated into two independent sequences: the first and the second Staatsexamen. For some degrees, such as physical therapists and psychotherapists, only one Staatsexamen is held.

Students usually study at university for four to eight years before they participate at final examinations to graduate by the first Staatsexamen. This shows the academic qualification and knowledge on theoretical and practical skills.

Afterward, teachers and jurists continue to the practical phase of two to three years in their future jobs ending with an examination sequence in order to graduate by the second Staatsexamen, which amongst other things tests their professional skills in their respective jobs.

In law, the first Staatsexamen (Erste juristische Prüfung, or first legal exam) consists since 2003 of two parts: The first part (the Schwerpunktbereich, i.e. elective subject) is taken at the university level under the authority of the respective universities and at their discretion. The second part is taken at the Oberlandesgerichte (Higher State Courts). The latter are often also the responsible authorities providing the administrative infrastructure during the Referendariat and in the end holding the exams of the second Staatsexamen. Only a lawyer possessing both Staatsexamina is a fully qualified lawyer (Volljurist or Assessor) and hence entitled to appear in court whether as judge, prosecutor, attorney (assumed representation is mandatory) or as an agent for the government. The performance on both Staatsexamen is graded on a scale of 0 - 18 points. Four points are required for passing the exam and nine points are the threshold for an exam with "distinction". The career prospects of German jurists are uniquely shaped by the results of the Staatsexamen. Approximately 13% of each class achieve a "distinction" in both state exams.

In medicine, the Staatsexamen (Ärztliche Prüfung, or physician exam) consists of three parts as of 2013. The first part is taken after the first two years of the six-year medical degree, i.e., after the basic sciences part of the degree (somewhat similar to U.S. pre-med) whereas the second part is taken after the fifth year of studies. Following a practical year, the third part follows at the end of the six-year medical degree.

In pharmacy, the Staatsexamen (Pharmazeutische Prüfung, or pharmaceutical exam) consists of three parts. The first part is taken after the first two years of the four-year pharmacy degree, the second part at the end of the four-year pharmacy degree, and the third part after the so-called Praktisches Jahr (practical year) that prospective pharmacists have to take after graduation.

In physical therapy, the Staatsexamen consists of one part. This one part takes place at the end of the four-year therapy degree and contains written, oral and practical exams.

In some cases, the second Staatsexamen can be a substitute for a doctorate when it comes to applying for certain jobs at a university (i.e., Akademischer Rat).

== Teaching position ==
The training to become a teacher at a primary, secondary school, special school, junior high school or high school (grammar school) comprises two phases: the teacher training course as the first phase with two school subjects and an educational part, e.g. with pedagogy and pedagogical psychology, at a university or equivalent scientific college. The degree is the "First State Examination" (increasingly replaced by the Master of Education degree). Qualification in a third subject (additional subject, see additional subject), which is also examined in the exam, is possible as part of an additional examination. The one to two-year legal traineeship or preparatory service forms the second phase, which ends with the “second state examination”. Both consist of the grades obtained in the respective examination phase, in particular the two subject grades and a homework grade, in some cases further grades in educational science, and in the case of the second exam also from at least one general assessment of the trainee teacher by the trainer.

In contrast to medical studies, for example, where the term "state examination" was also used for a while for another partial examination, the synonymous term "state examination" is regulated in the regulations for the teaching degree courses: In state law in Baden-Württemberg, for example, the Gymnasium teacher examination regulations I (GymPO I of July 31, 2009, valid from September 1, 2009 to December 31, 2024).
