= Deutscher Tonkünstlerverband =

The Deutscher Tonkünstlerverband is the oldest and largest professional association for musicians in Germany. The umbrella organization with headquarters in Munich and a branch office in Passau is the professional representative for all music professions (performers, conductors, composers, music educators, and university and music teachers), representing approximately 8,300 members. The organization was established in 1847.
