= Hinrichsen Foundation =

The Hinrichsen Foundation
- Founded: 1976
- Founder: Carla Eddy Hinrichsen
- Type: Charitable Incorporated Organisation
- Location: London, England
- Region served: United Kingdom
- Key people: Ed McKeon (Chair)
- Website: hinrichsenfoundation.org.uk

The Hinrichsen Foundation is a British charitable organisation established in 1976 to support contemporary and experimental music in the United Kingdom. Founded by Carla Eddy Hinrichsen to continue the Hinrichsen family's tradition of music patronage as proprietors of Edition Peters, the foundation provides grants for the performance, commissioning, and recording of contemporary music.

Until 2023, the Foundation held a controlling interest in Edition Peters Group. Following the sale of Edition Peters to Wise Music Group, the Foundation now operates from an investment portfolio, marking a new chapter focused on strategic partnerships and long-term support for the UK's contemporary music sector.

== History ==
=== Background and founding ===
The Hinrichsen Foundation was established in 1976 by Carla Eddy Hinrichsen, widow of music publisher Max Hinrichsen. The Foundation was created to ensure the continuation of the Hinrichsen family's long-standing tradition of supporting contemporary music, established through their ownership of Edition Peters, a music publishing house founded in Leipzig in 1800.

Henri Hinrichsen, Max's father, became a partner in Edition Peters in 1894 and took over following the death of his uncle, Max Abraham, in 1900. Under Henri's direction, Edition Peters published works by Gustav Mahler, Arnold Schoenberg, Richard Strauss, Hugo Wolf, and other major composers of the early 20th century.

During the Nazi regime, the Hinrichsen family faced persecution. Henri Hinrichsen's music publishing business was "Aryanised" in 1938–39, and he was murdered at Auschwitz concentration camp on 17 September 1942. His son Max Hinrichsen had emigrated to London in 1937, where he founded Hinrichsen Edition Ltd (later Peters Edition Ltd) in 1938. Max Hinrichsen died in London on 17 December 1965, after which his American wife Carla Eddy Hinrichsen (née Eddy, from Lawrence, Kansas) took over management of the London music publishing house.

Carla Hinrichsen established the Foundation in 1976 to continue the family's patronage of contemporary music. She died on 2 December 2005 in London.

=== Relationship with Edition Peters (1976–2023) ===
From its inception, the Hinrichsen Foundation maintained a close relationship with Peters Edition Limited (later Edition Peters Group). The Foundation held a 100% beneficial interest in Peters Edition Limited, with the company serving as the charity's primary source of income. In June 2007, the Foundation acquired 100% voting rights in Peters Edition Limited, making it effectively a wholly owned subsidiary of the charity.

In 2010, following years of negotiation between the separate Peters firms (London, New York, Frankfurt, and Leipzig), Edition Peters Group was formed with the Hinrichsen Foundation holding the majority ownership and Christian Hinrichsen (grandson of Walter Hinrichsen) holding the remaining interest.

In April 2023, Wise Music Group acquired a controlling interest in Edition Peters Group from the Hinrichsen Foundation, in partnership with Christian Hinrichsen. The sale marked a significant transition for the Foundation, enabling it to focus entirely on grant-making activities funded by an investment portfolio rather than publishing revenues.

=== Development of grant-making activities ===
The Foundation is a registered Charitable Incorporated Organisation (CIO) in England and Wales.

In 2012, the Foundation introduced a "New Initiatives Scheme" to provide multi-year support for larger-scale projects. Over three years, seven awards totalling £150,000 were made to support performances, recordings, workshops, commissions, and bursaries. The scheme was subsequently suspended while trustees reflected on areas of success.

In August 2025, the Foundation announced a major revival of multi-year partnerships, unveiling £165,000 in awards distributed over three years (August 2025 – July 2028) to six organisations: NMC Recordings, Huddersfield Contemporary Music Festival, Sound Scotland, The Night With..., PRXLUDES, and the London Symphony Orchestra (LSO). This announcement coincided with preparations for the Foundation's 50th anniversary of grant-making in 2026.

== Grant programmes ==
The Foundation provides two levels of project funding:

- Small grants: Typically between £500 and £2,500 for new applicants and former beneficiaries
- Larger grants: Generally £2,000 and over for larger projects or concert series

Applications are considered three times annually, with decisions typically communicated within five weeks of deadlines.

Following the 2023 sale of Edition Peters, the Foundation introduced a new multi-year partnership programme designed to support longer-term strategic goals.

== Governance ==
The Hinrichsen Foundation operates as a Charitable Incorporated Organisation (CIO) registered with the Charity Commission for England and Wales. The Foundation's constitution provides for a minimum of six and a maximum of twelve trustees.

The Hinrichsen Foundation's primary charitable objectives are:

- Making grants to assist the public performance of contemporary music
- Support for independent musicological research

As of January 2024, the trustees were:

- Dr Ed McKeon (Chair)
- Tim Berg
- Mark Bromley
- Tabby Estell
- Bobbie-Jane Gardner
- Gavin Higgins
- Dr Linda Hirst
- Dr Christian Mason
- Professor Stephen Walsh

== See also ==
- Edition Peters
- Music patronage
- Contemporary classical music
- Arts Council England
- PRS Foundation
