= Sramek =

Sramek may refer to:

- Šrámek, a Czech surname
- Šramek, a Czech and Slovak surname
- Christoph Sramek (born 1950), German music historian
