= Hella Brock =

German music educator (1919–2020)

- Born: Hella Maria Siegmund-Schultze; 3 October 1919; Schweinitz, Province of Saxony, Prussia, Germany
- Died: 30 November 2020 (aged 101); Dippoldiswalde, Germany
- Education: University of Breslau, University of Vienna, Vienna Academy of Music
- Occupations: Music scholar, writer
- Organization: University of Leipzig
- Known for: Edvard Grieg scholar
- Relatives: Walther Siegmund-Schultze (brother)

Hella Maria Brock (née Siegmund-Schultze; 3 October 1919 – 30 November 2020) was a German music educator, musicologist, and an internationally known Edvard Grieg scholar. Brock was professor of music and English studies at the Leipzig University. She was president, and honorary president of the Grieg-Begegnungsstätte in Leipzig until her death in 2020.

== Life ==
She was born Hella Maria Siegmund-Schultze in Schweinitz, now part of Jessen as the daughter of the lawyer and mayor of Schweinitz, Hans Siegmund-Schultze, and his wife, the teacher Ida née Böhme. She attended elementary schools in Magdeburg and Liegnitz, and from 1934 to 1939 the Lyzeum in Liegnitz, where she passed the Abitur in 1939. She was called up for the Reichsarbeitsdienst (compulsory service). From 1940 to 1942 she studied musicology, music pedagogy, piano and English literature at the University of Breslau. She continued her studies in Vienna from 1942 to 1944 at the University of Vienna and the Vienna Academy of Music, where she passed the Staatsexamen for teaching music at secondary schools at the university in March 1944. She then pursued studies of English language and literature at the University of Breslau until the war-related evacuation in 1945.

After flight and expulsion, she moved to Wegeleben in February 1945. At the University of Halle she passed the external Staatsexamen in English language and literature for the teaching profession at secondary schools in March 1945, and in the autumn the exam for Assessor, the higher teaching profession in music and English. From 1946 she worked as a teacher at schools in Halle and Merseburg, and from 1947 as a lecturer in English and German at the Arbeiter-und-Bauern-Fakultät of the University of Berlin. In 1952, Brock began an aspirancy (research assistantship) at the Institute for Music Education of the Martin Luther University Halle-Wittenberg, where she was awarded a doctorate in 1955 with a dissertation on the Dramaturgy of the Schuloper of the 20th century, supervised by Fritz Reuter.

In 1959, she became the founding director of the Institute for Music Education at the Ernst-Moritz-Arndt-University of Greifswald, where she taught the methodology of music teaching, work analysis and music history. In Greifswald, she habilitated (completed postdoctoral research) in 1960 with a thesis, again with Reuter, on Inhalt und Funktion des deutschen Schulliederbuches von der Gründung des Deutschen Reiches bis zum Ende des 2. Weltkrieges (English: Content and function of the German school song book from the foundation of the German Reich to the end of World War II) and was appointed professor for theory and methodology of music education in 1963. In 1972 she was appointed professor of cultural studies and German studies at the Karl-Marx-Universität Leipzig. Brock worked for many years on the commission for the development of study programs for music education in the GDR and was temporarily head of this commission. She retired at the end of the spring semester 1980.

From 1967 to 1971, she was a member of the Volkskammer in the parliamentary group of the Cultural Association of the GDR.

== Grieg research ==
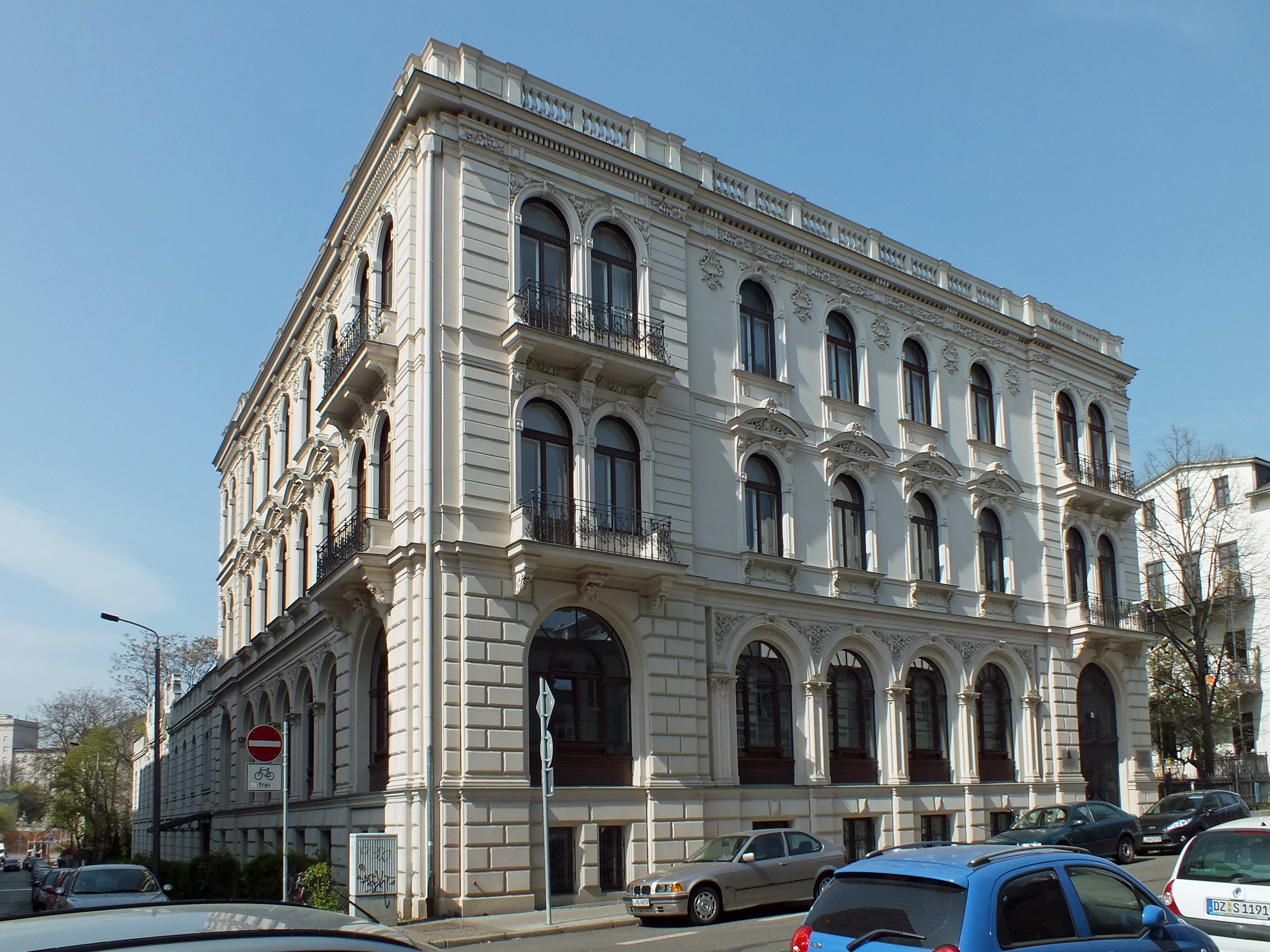
Grieg-Begegnungsstätte in Leipzig

Brock first dealt with Edvard Grieg in Greifswald, when she invited the Norwegian musicologist Olav Gurvin to a lecture on Grieg during the Ostseewoche. In 1985 she received permission to travel to Oslo for research purposes. In the following years she completed her knowledge of the Norwegian language and collaborated with Grieg researchers from the Norwegian Academy of Science and Letters. Brock published fundamental works about Grieg in German.

Brock was significantly involved in the preservation of the former place of work of Edvard Grieg in Leipzig. In October 1998 the association Grieg-Begegnungsstätte (Grieg Meeting Place) was founded in Leipzig, to establish a memorial and meeting place for the composer in the house built in 1874 by Otto Brückwald for the Edition Peters publishing house. Brock was elected the first president of the association. They were successful in restoring the dilapidated private rooms of the publisher families Max Abraham and Henri Hinrichsen, where Grieg had been a frequent guest, with his guest apartment. The rooms were opened to the public in 2005.

Under Brock's leadership, the association held two Grieg conferences with international participation in 2004 and 2008. She resigned from presidency in 2008, and became its honorary president.

== Family ==
Brock had a daughter (born 1953) and a son (born 1955). Her brother Walther Siegmund-Schultze was also a musicologist. Brock died in Dippoldiswalde at age 101 of a COVID-19 infection.

== Awards ==
Brock received awards including:

- Medaille für ausgezeichnete Leistungen (1958, 1964)
- Pestalozzi-Medaille für treue Dienste in Bronze (1964)
- Clara Zetkin Medal (1971)
- Ehrenmitglied der Internationalen Edvard-Grieg-Gesellschaft (2009)
- Ehrenpräsidentin des Vereins Grieg-Begegnungsstätte Leipzig (2009)

== Publications ==
Brock's publications include:

- Musiktheater in der Schule. Eine Dramaturgie der Schuloper. Breitkopf & Härtel, Leipzig 1960.
- Unterrichtshilfen Musik. 7. und 8. Klasse (together with Herbert Zimpel), Verlag Volk und Wissen, Berlin 1970.
- Jugendlexikon Musik (edited together with Christoph Kleinschmidt), Bibliographisches Institut, Leipzig 1983., ISBN 3-323-00291-1
- Musik hören – Musik erleben. Verlag Volk und Wissen, Berlin 1985., ISBN 978-3-06-152118-9
- Edvard Grieg. Reclam-Verlag, Leipzig 1990, ISBN 3-379-00609-2.
- Edvard Grieg im Musikunterricht. Betrachtungen unter interkulturellen und polyästhetischen Aspekten. Hildegard-Junker-Verlag, Altenmedingen 1995, ISBN 3-928783-39-4.
- Edvard Grieg. Briefwechsel mit dem Musikverlag C. F. Peters 1863–1907. (together with Finn Benestad), Edition Peters, Frankfurt Main 1997, ISBN 3-87626-010-8.
- Edvard Grieg als Musikschriftsteller. Hildegard-Junker-Verlag, Altenmedingen 1999, ISBN 3-928783-81-5.
- Griegs Musik zu Ibsens Peer Gynt. Bereicherung und Eigenständigkeit. Hildegard-Junker-Verlag, Altenmedingen 2001, ISBN 3-928783-91-2.
