= Udo Klement =

German musicologist (born 1936)

Udo Fritz Peter Klement (born 12 January 1936) is a German musicologist and music critic.

== Life ==
Klement, non-denominational, was born in 1936 in Dresden as the son of a gear cutter and an agricultural worker and saleswoman. He attended the Dresdner Kreuzschule and the Oberschule Dresden West Abitur 1954). From 1954 to 1958 he studied music education and German language and literature at the philosophical faculty of the Karl-Marx-University Leipzig. In 1958 he passed the Staatsexamen for the teaching profession in music (at the 12-class secondary school). Afterwards he was a teacher of music and German, in 1964 he acquired the teaching qualification for German (up to grade 10).

From 1966 to 1969 he was a research assistant for music education at the Institute for Musicology of the University of Leipzig. In 1969 he was awarded a doctorate by Paul Willert with the musicological Dissertation A "Das Musiktheater Carl Orffs. Untersuchungen zu einem bürgerlichen Kunstwerk" to the degree of Dr. phil. The other reviewers of the work were Walther Siegmund-Schultze and the Orff student Paul Kurzbach.

He then became senior research assistant for music education at the Department of Musicology, section Theory and Methodology of Music Education, and in 1972 in the section Historical and Systematic Musicology in the Cultural Studies and German Studies Section, and in 1976 in the Cultural and Artistic Sciences Section. In 1976 he received the Facultas docendi. In 1977 he received his "Promotion B" as Dr. sc. phil. in musicology (topic: "The importance of the dramatic in the orchestral music of the German Democratic Republic"). Besides Walther Siegmund-Schultze, this time Ernst Hermann Meyer and Hella Brock were among the reviewers. In 1991 the academic degree was changed to Dr. phil. habil.

From 1977 he was a lecturer, from 1980 to 1993 full professor for music history at the Section for Cultural and Art Studies of the Karl Marx University Leipzig. He was then dismissed and went into early retirement. In addition to music history, his main areas of research were the dramaturgy of classical instrumental music, the history of musicology, music analysis and criticism, and symphonic music. From 1967 to 1969 he was a managing assistant at the Institute for Musicology and from 1973 to 1975 he was head of the teaching staff Music/German. From 1981 to 1985 he was Section Director and from 1986 to 1990 Head of the Department of Musicology and Music Education. Among his academic students were among others Ulrike Liedtke and Christoph Sramek.

From 1973 to 1989 he was a member of the Association of Composers and Musicologists of the GDR, and from 1982 to 1989 he was a member of the central board. He was repeatedly a member of the musicology working group of the Scientific Advisory Board for Cultural, Artistic and Linguistic Studies at the Ministry of Higher and Technical Education (East Germany). From 1986 to 1989 he was chairman of the Central Expert Commission for Music Education at the Council of Ministers of East Germany.

Klement was a permanent contributor and music critic for the daily newspaper Die Union. From 1973 to 1989 he contributed articles on the "GDR musical development" for the Yearbook of the Great Soviet Encyclopedia in Moscow. From 1973 he edited musical keywords for all encyclopaedias of the Bibliographisches Institut in Leipzig.

== Awards ==
- 1965: Medaille für ausgezeichnete Leistungen
- 1968: Pestalozzi-Medaille für treue Dienste (Bronze)
- 1978: Pestalozzi-Medaille für treue Dienste (Silber)
- 1978: Ehrennadel des Komponistenverbandes (Bronze)
- 1983: Kunstpreis der Stadt Leipzig für Kunstkritik
- 1986: Ehrennadel des Komponistenverbandes (Silber)
- 1988: Verdienstmedaille der DDR
- 1990: Pestalozzi-Medaille für treue Dienste (Gold)

== Publications ==
- Das Musiktheater Carl Orffs(Beiträge zur musikwissenschaftlichen Forschung in der DDR. Bd. 14). Deutscher Verlag für Musik, Leipzig 1982.
- Die Bedeutung des Dramaturgischen in der Orchestermusik der Deutschen Demokratischen Republik.
