= Ligeti Quartet =

British string quartet

- Origin: United Kingdom
- Genres: Contemporary classical music
- Years active: 2010–present
- Members: Freya Goldmark (violin I), Patrick Dawkins (violin II), Richard Jones (viola), Valerie Welbanks (cello)
- Past members: Mandhira de Saram (violin I)
- Website: https://ligetiquartet.com

The Ligeti Quartet is a British string quartet ensemble founded in 2010, best known for its performances and advocacy of modern and contemporary music. The group has commissioned and premiered new works by living composers, championed genre-crossing collaborations, and appeared at prominent venues and festivals internationally.

== History ==
The quartet was established in 2010 by graduates from the Royal Academy of Music, the Royal College of Music, and the University of Oxford with the main aim to champion contemporary repertoire and innovative presentation. The ensemble takes its name from the Hungarian avant-garde composer György Ligeti, reflecting the quartet’s focus on inventive and exploratory repertoire.

The group has served in several educational and residency roles, including positions at the University of Cambridge, the University of Sheffield, Goldsmiths, University of London, and Nottingham High School, where they led workshops and community outreach initiatives.

The Ligeti Quartet has performed in venues such as Carnegie Hall, Kings Place, Wigmore Hall, Purcell Room and Barbican Hall.

== Festivals and Tours ==
The Ligeti Quartet has appeared at international music festivals and events, performing in the UK, Europe, North America, and beyond. Notable examples include:

- Bang on a Can Festival (New York), where they gave the US premiere of their album project Nuc.
- CrossCurrents Festival (Birmingham and Bogotá), featuring electroacoustic and contemporary works alongside international ensembles.
- Rainy Days Festival at the Philharmonie Luxembourg, where they premiered multiple new works.
- Aldeburgh Festival, including curated events celebrating Ligeti’s centenary and world premieres by contemporary composers.

== Collaborations and Commissions ==
The quartet has collaborated with a wide range of composers and performers across musical genres. These include:

- Anna Meredith, with whom they developed the *Nuc* project.
- Christian Mason, whose “‘Songbooks’” concept has been central to one of their recorded projects.
- Sean Noonan, Shabaka Hutchings, Laura Jurd, Kerry Andrew, Elliot Galvin, Submotion Orchestra, and others spanning jazz, electronic, and experimental idioms.

They have commissioned new works funded by national trusts and arts organisations including Britten Pears Arts, the Hinrichsen Foundation, the Vaughan Williams Foundation, and Arts Council England.

== Awards and Recognition ==
The Ligeti Quartet has received multiple grants and awards supporting both artistic creation and community engagement, including:

- Arts Council England National Lottery Project Grants for initiatives like their *Workout!* project, which workshopped and recorded 100 new pieces by 100 composers.
- Emerging Excellence Award from the UK Musician’s Benevolent Fund.
- Grants from the Vaughan Williams Foundation, Britten-Pears Foundation, and others for commissioning new works.
- Winners of the St John’s Smith Square Young Artists Scheme.

== Discography ==
The Ligeti Quartet’s discography includes:

- Songbooks, Vol. 1 (2020, Nonclassical) – a collaboration with composer Christian Mason exploring vocal traditions and extended string techniques; the *Tuvan Songbook* suite was shortlisted for a British Composer Award.
- Nuc (2023, Mercury KX) – an album of works by Anna Meredith, arranged and performed by the quartet, released on vinyl, CD, and digital formats.

Additional recordings and releases can be found in commercial discographies and music databases.

== Educational and Community Work ==
In addition to residencies at major universities, the quartet has undertaken educational outreach globally, including workshops at institutions such as the Royal Conservatory of Music in Canada’s Glenn Gould School and the Royal Danish Academy of Music in Copenhagen.
