= Šrámek =

Šrámek (feminine: Šrámková) is a Czech and Slovak surname. It is a diminutive of the Czech and Slovak word šrám ('scratch', 'gash', 'scar'). The surname was created based on the appearance of the bearer. Notable people with the surname include:

- Bohunka Šrámková (born 1946), Czech pair skater
- Fráňa Šrámek (1877–1952), Czech poet
- Helena Šrámková (1883–1974), Czech painter
- Jan Šrámek (1870–1956), Czech politician
- Jan Šrámek (figure skater) (born 1945), Czech figure skater
- Jaroslav Šrámek (1929–2015), Czech fighter pilot
- Ľuboš Šrámek (born 1977), Slovak composer , jazz pianist, teacher and music producer

== See also ==
- Šramek, a similar surname
- Christoph Sramek (born 1950), German music historian
