= Jeremy Thurlow =

- Education: Clare College, Cambridge; Guildhall School of Music and Drama; King's College, London
- Occupation: Composer

Jeremy Thurlow is an English composer, known for his chamber music, orchestral scores, vocal music setting English and French poetry as well as experimental texts, and music for dance and stage and is performed across the UK and in France, Spain, Italy, Germany, Sweden, Romania, Japan, Korea and the USA. His music has been performed by BBC Philharmonic Orchestra, The Scottish Chamber Orchestra, Matthew Schellhorn, the Fitzwilliam String Quartet, the Aronowitz Ensemble, the Kreutzer Quartet, Rolf Hind, The Schubert Ensemble, Sequitur, the Alinea Quartett, Endymion, the Ligeti Quartet, Alec Frank-Gemmill, The Hermes Experiment, Krysia Osostowicz, The Echea Quartet, The Norrbottens Kammarorkester, Peter Sheppard Skaerved, Symphonova, the Choir of St John's College, Cambridge, Trinity College Choir, the Dr K Sextet and the BBC Singers.

He is a Fellow of Robinson College, University of Cambridge, where he teaches and lectures in music and composition.

== Compositions (selection) ==
- This is the garden (2004), for choir (SATB) and four horns
- The Will of the Tones (2004), for piano solo
- Strange Light (2004), for choir (SATB), organ and solo horn; words by R. S. Thomas
- Search Engines (2002–06), for orchestra
- Piano Concerto (2000, rev. 2006), for piano and chamber orchestra
- The She-Wolf (2004), fable for soprano, cello and piano
- Music for Strings and Hammers (2006–07), for four pianos, honky-tonk and celesta
- A sudden cartography of song (2007), video-opera for four solo voices (SATB), narrator, video and live electronics; words and video by Alistair Appleton.
- Exultation is the going (2007), for unaccompanied choir (SSAATTBB); words by Emily Dickinson
- Endlessly enmeshed (2007), for sarangi, tabla, cello, harp, piano, percussion.
- The Pedlar of Swaffham (2007), a fable for soprano and five instruments
- Nesting (2008), for wind quintet
- Unbidden Visions (2008), for tenor, horn and piano.
- String Quartet no. 1 (2008)
- Breath (2008), for ensemble
- Wheels within wheels (2008), for cello and piano
- That Second Realm (2009), dance-piece for six instruments (flute, oboe, string quartet) and eight dancers
- Fantazia (2009), for string quartet (Homage to Purcell)
- Orion (2009), for horn, violin and piano
- Butterfly (2009), for solo piano
- Properties of Light (2009), dance-piece for instrumental septet (clarinet, horn, trumpet, marimba, violin, viola, cello), vocal quartet (SATB) and six dancers
- When Joseph was a-walking (2009), carol for choir (SSATBB)
- Bread and meat and fish and wine (2010), carol for choir (SATB) and organ
- Lob sei Gott (2010), for organ. Chorale prelude written for the Orgelbüchlein Project
- A sense of touch, for four pianos.
- Miró's Ladder (2011), for solo recorder
- Magnificat and Nunc Dimittis (the Caius Service) (2011), for choir and organ
- Ouija (2012), for solo violin and electronics
- Plus avant que l'étoile (2012), for flute and piano (after Yves Bonnefoy)
- I got me flowers (2012), Easter anthem for unaccompanied choir (SATB), words by George Herbert
- Magnificat (2012), for girls' voices, organ and electronics (the St Catharine's Service)
- Plus avant que l'étoile, for flute and piano.
- Soft-born measureless light (2012), for piano solo
- Piano Trio no. 1 (2013)
- Virelai Dame, vostre doulz viaire (2013), for flute and piano (after Guillaume de Machaut)
- Steeples' Eclipse (Piano Trio no. 2) (2013)
- Gazelle (2013), for solo harp
- Self-ablaze (2014), for violin and piano
- Quiet songs (2014), for soprano, clarinet, harp and double bass (poems by Yves Bonnefoy).
- Light – dark – sea (2015), for soprano and ensemble.
- Lucis largitor (2015), for double choir (SATB x2)
- Over the Frost (2015), for vocal sextet, alto flute and harp. Poetry by Stephen Romer.
- A London Street in Winter (2016), for mezzo soprano and piano (words by Virginia Woolf).
- Sea-cradling (2016) (string quartet no. 2)
- Memory is the seamstress (2016) (string quartet no. 3)
- Tread softly (2017), for large orchestra
- Oracle (2017), concerto for trumpet and ensemble
- Elephant of the clouds (2018), for fl, bass cl, vn, cello, piano, percussion, tape.
- A world in scent and touch (2018), song-cycle for voice and piano; poems by John Burnside.
- I see a ring (2018), for choir and piano (words by Virginia Woolf).
- Ladder of the escaping eye (2019), for two recorders.
- Crooked consort (2019), concerto for natural horn and strings.
- By way of the roof (2019), for cello and piano.
- Château Barrière (2020), concerto for piano and chamber orchestra.
- Earthquake in the soul (2020), for solo soprano, 8-part chorus, orchestra. Words by Hildegard of Bingen.
- Understory (2021), for string quartet.
- Cinquante-six durées-couleurs (2021), for organ.
- Slow Tide (2009, rev. 2022), for two pianos and four percussionists
- Four places of the soul (2022), concerto for cello and chamber orchestra.

== Writings ==
Thurlow's Henri Dutilleux: la musique des rêves/the music of dreams is an in-depth study of a major figure of 20th-century French music. He has also published articles on French post-war music, including a study of Messiaen's birdsong style in a Cambridge University Press volume, Messiaen Studies. He has appeared regularly on BBC Radio 3, writing and broadcasting programmes about Fauré, Messiaen, Stravinsky and Schoenberg, and has contributed to the revised New Grove Dictionary of Music and Musicians (2000).
