= Šramek =

Šramek (feminine: Šramková) is a Czech and Slovak surname. Notable people with the surname include:

- Alfred Šramek (1951–2016), Austrian opera singer
- Jana Šramková (born 1976), Czech rhythmic gymnast
- Rebecca Šramková (born 1996), Slovak tennis player

== See also ==
- Šrámek, similar surname
- Christoph Sramek (born 1950), German music historian
