= Max Abraham (publisher) =

German music publisher (1831-1900)

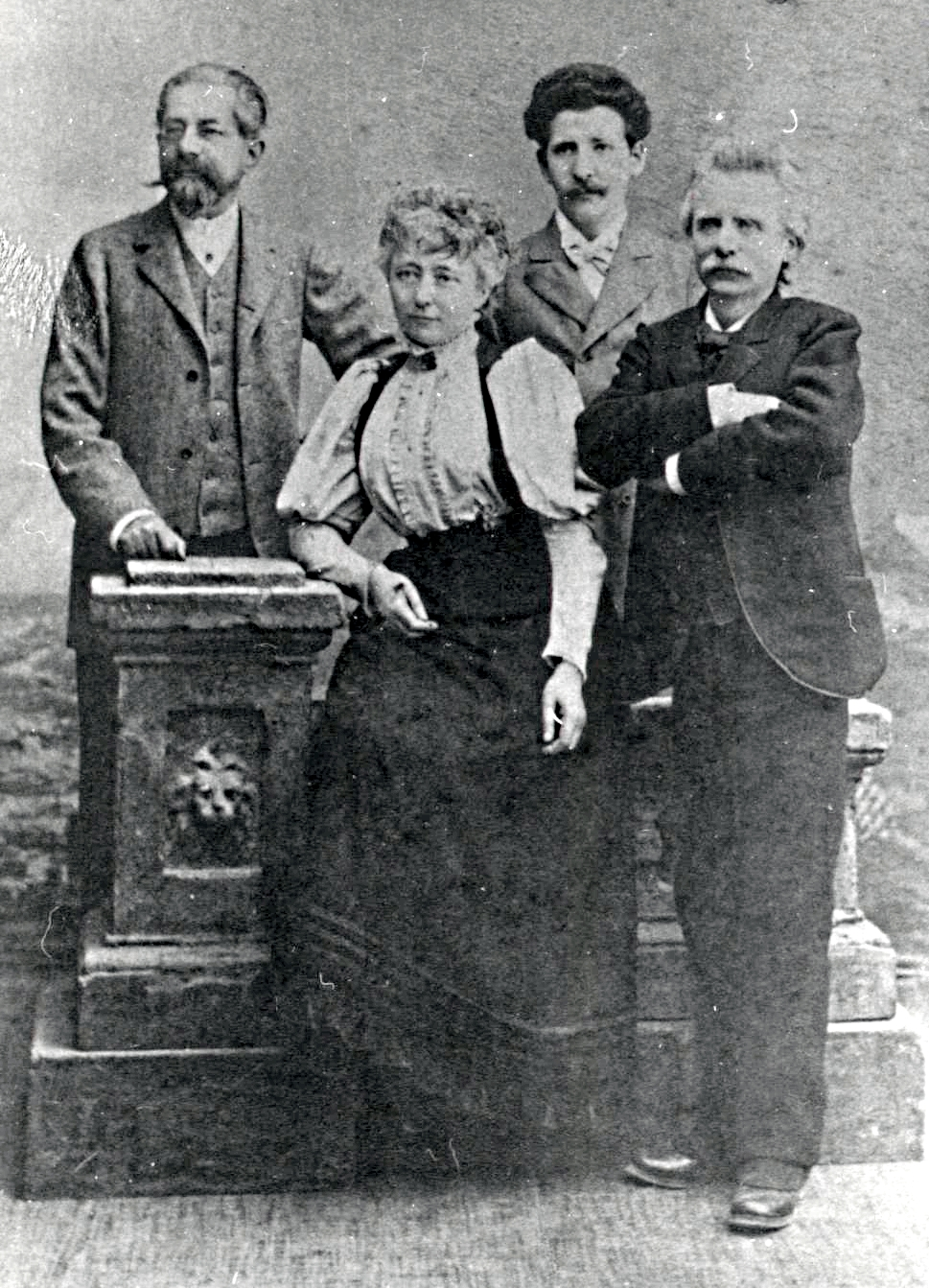
- Max Abraham (left) with Nina and Edvard Grieg
- Born: June 3, 1831; Danzig, Kingdom of Prussia
- Died: December 8, 1900 (aged 69); Leipzig, German Empire
- Occupation: Music publisher
- Known for: Head of the C. F. Peters publishing house; founder of Edition Peters; establishment of the Peters Music Library
- Successor: Henri Hinrichsen

Max Abraham (June 3, 1831 – December 8, 1900) was a German music publisher.

== Biography ==
Max Abraham attended the Municipal Gymnasium in Danzig. He studied music in his hometown of Danzig and economics in London. He studied law in Heidelberg, Bonn, and Berlin. He passed his exams in Berlin and was awarded a doctorate in law in Heidelberg without having to submit a written dissertation. During his studies, he became a member of the Alemannia Bonn fraternity in 1851.

Born in Danzig, Abraham became a partner in the C.F. Peters publishing house in 1863, taking over as its sole proprietor in 1880. He founded its Edition Peters, and was succeeded as head of the firm by his nephew, Henri Hinrichsen.

In 1873, Abraham acquired an undeveloped property on Leipziger Talstrasse and had the architect Otto Brückwald build a residential and commercial building on it. In 1874, this became the headquarters of the music publisher CF Peters. In this house there is now an Edvard Grieg memorial. In 1893, Max Abraham donated the Peters Music Library in Leipzig, which opened on January 2, 1894. It is considered the first of its kind in Germany and was an inspiration for Wilhelm Altmann to create an even more comprehensive collection

He died in Leipzig by committing suicide.

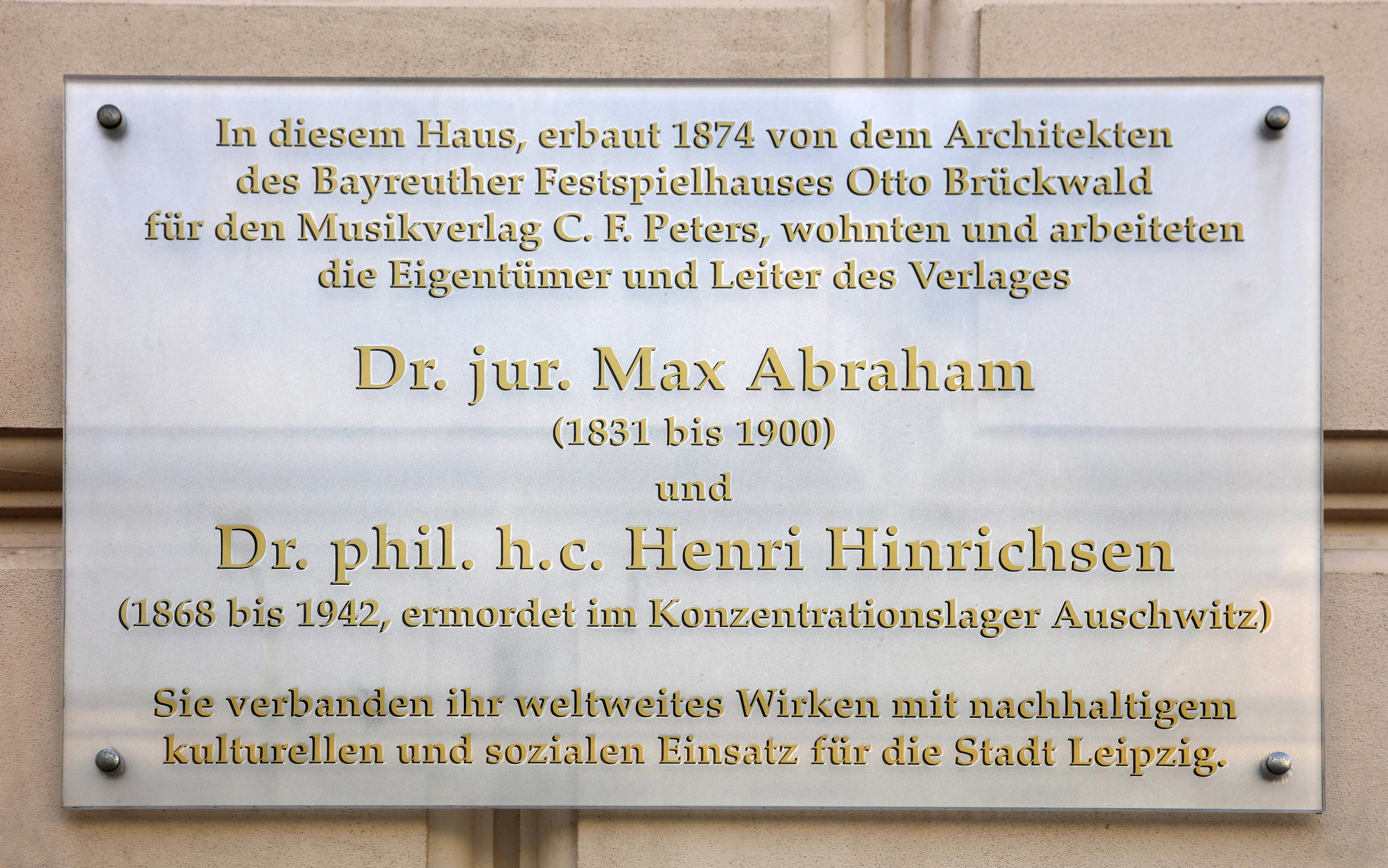
Max Abraham Memorial Plaque

== Commemoration ==
Since 1910 (with an interruption from 1935 to 1945), Abrahamstraße in the Neulindenau district of Leipzig has been named in his honor.

The Abraham/Hinrichsen family tomb at Leipzig’s Südfriedhof was leveled in the 1980s; since 1992, a monument has marked its former location.

== Literature ==
- The letters of Max Abraham to Edvard Grieg (Edvard Grieg: Correspondence, Vol. 1). Hänsel-Hohenhausen, Frankfurt am Main, 2nd, revised, newly annotated edition 2005, ISBN 3-937909-55-9 .
- Irene Lawford-Hinrichsen: Music Publishing and Patronage - CF Peters: 1800 to the Holocaust. Edition Press, London 2000, ISBN 0-9536112-0-5 .
- Irene Lawford-Hinrichsen, Norbert Molkenbur: "CF Peters – a German music publisher in Leipzig's cultural life. On the work of Max Abraham and Henri Hinrichsen." In: Ephraim Carlebach Foundation (ed.): Judaica Lipsiensia. On the History of the Jews in Leipzig. Edition Leipzig, Leipzig 1994. P. 92–109.
- Wilhelm Altmann: "The future "German Music Collection" at the Royal Library." Central Journal for Libraries, Vol. 23 (1906), H. 2, p. 67.
- Georg von Dadelsen: "Abraham, Max." In New German Biography (NDB). Volume 1, Duncker & Humblot, Berlin 1953, ISBN 3-428-00182-6, p. 22 f. ( digital copy ).
- Helge Dvorak: Biographical Encyclopedia of the German Fraternity. Volume II: Artists. Winter, Heidelberg 2018, ISBN 978-3-8253-6813-5, pp. 2–3.
