= Vaughan Williams Foundation =

British music-related charity

- Founded: October 12, 2022
- Founder: Ralph Vaughan Williams (RVW Trust, 1956); Ursula Vaughan Williams (VWCT, 2007)
- Type: Charitable Incorporated Organisation
- Purpose: Support for composers; Music education; Preservation of RVW's legacy
- Location: London, England
- Method: Grants and scholarships
- Key people: Sally Groves MBE (Chair)
- Revenue: Funded by royalties from RVW's music
- Website: vaughanwilliamsfoundation.org
- Formerly called: RVW Trust (1956–2022); Vaughan Williams Charitable Trust (2008–2022)

The Vaughan Williams Foundation (VWF) is a British grant-giving charity that supports composers and promotes the music of Ralph Vaughan Williams and Ursula Vaughan Williams. Established in 2022 on the 150th anniversary of the composer's birth, it merged two predecessor trusts: the RVW Trust (founded 1956) and the Vaughan Williams Charitable Trust (founded 2008). The foundation is funded by royalties from Vaughan Williams's music and awards grants averaging £300,000 annually.

== History ==
=== RVW Trust (1956–2022) ===
The RVW Trust was established by Ralph Vaughan Williams in 1956, two years before his death, with the intention that all future income from the performing rights in his music should benefit fellow composers and future generations. The composer, known for his generosity throughout his life, wanted to ensure this support would continue after his death.

Over its 66-year history, the trust became one of the most significant sources of funding for contemporary British and Irish music in the United Kingdom. It supported festivals, recording companies, individual musicians, and composers building their careers, with a particular focus on championing less familiar repertoire and new work.

Notable figures in the trust's history included Lord Armstrong of Ilminster, who served as a trustee from the trust's inception until his death in 2020, and Michael Kennedy, the music critic and close friend of Vaughan Williams, who chaired the trust until 2008.

=== Vaughan Williams Charitable Trust (2008–2022) ===
Following the death of Ursula Vaughan Williams in 2007, the Vaughan Williams Charitable Trust was established under the terms of her will, becoming active in 2008. The composer's share of publishing rights funded the new trust, which focused on promoting knowledge of Vaughan Williams's work through performances, recordings, research, and definitive new editions.

Michael Kennedy chaired the VWCT until his death in 2014. The trust undertook several major projects, including creating a fully searchable database of over 5,000 items of Vaughan Williams's correspondence, available free online. The trust also spearheaded the RVW150 celebrations in 2022–23, marking the 150th anniversary of the composer's birth.

=== Merger and formation of VWF (2022) ===
On 12 October 2022, exactly 150 years after Vaughan Williams's birth, the trustees of both charities launched the Vaughan Williams Foundation, merging the work of the two trusts. The aim of the merger was to continue supporting musicians beyond the expiration of copyright in Vaughan Williams's music in 2028.

The foundation was launched at a celebration held at LSO St Luke's in London, with the first grants announced in March 2023.

== Activities and funding ==
=== Grant programmes ===
The Vaughan Williams Foundation operates three annual funding rounds for organisations and individuals, supporting:

- The performance, commission, and recording of music by British and Irish composers active in the last 100 years
- Projects that further knowledge and understanding of the lives and works of Ralph and Ursula Vaughan Williams

The foundation has supported a wide range of beneficiaries, including festivals, orchestras, ensembles, opera companies, national organisations, composers, individual performers, and recording companies.

=== Vaughan Williams Scholarships ===
Since the early 1980s, the foundation and its predecessor trusts have awarded postgraduate composition scholarships. Four scholarships of £8,000 each are awarded annually to postgraduate students of composition demonstrating exceptional talent and planning professional careers in composition.

Over 270 composers have received scholarships, including:

- Julian Anderson CBE
- Anna Meredith
- Graham Fitkin
- Larry Goves
- Gavin Higgins
- Hannah Kendall
- Daniel Kidane
- Christian Alexander

=== RVW150 anniversary ===
The Vaughan Williams Charitable Trust coordinated nationwide RVW150 celebrations in 2022–23, which included performances of symphonies, ballets, and operas, as well as travelling folk music concerts and cathedral choir performances. The RVW Trust supported a special series of new commissions inspired by Vaughan Williams's music, life, and ideas, including works by Grace-Evangeline Mason, James B. Wilson, Liz Lane, and Sarah Cattley.

Partnerships were established with the Music Teachers Association and the Royal School of Church Music to create free educational resources about Vaughan Williams's work for all levels of education.

== Digital resources ==
The foundation's website provides free access to unique resources about Ralph Vaughan Williams:

- Over 5,000 fully indexed and searchable annotated transcriptions of Vaughan Williams's correspondence with friends, family, pupils, and fellow musicians
- An extensive catalogue of the composer's published works with publisher contact information
- A selection of photographs from Ursula Vaughan Williams's collection, available for download for editorial purposes

These materials are housed physically in the British Library.

== Governance ==
The Vaughan Williams Foundation is registered as a Charitable Incorporated Organisation (CIO) and is funded by royalties from Ralph Vaughan Williams's music. The foundation represents the estates of Ralph and Ursula Vaughan Williams and holds copyright shares in their musical works (together with the original publishers) and writings.

=== Current trustees ===
The foundation is chaired by Sally Groves MBE, a close friend of Ursula Vaughan Williams who previously worked as a music publisher at Schott Music. She received the Royal Philharmonic Society's Lesley Boosey Award for championing new music.

Other current and recent trustees include:

- John Axon – Former trustee of Help Musicians and former executive director of PRS for Music
- Dr Nicolas Bell – Librarian and Fellow of Trinity College, Cambridge, former curator at the British Library
- Professor Richard Causton – Composer and Professor of Composition at the University of Cambridge
- Hugh Cobbe OBE – Former head of music collections at the British Library, editor of Letters of Ralph Vaughan Williams 1895–1958, chaired the RVW Trust 2008–2022
- Helen Faulkner – Former CEO of the Musicians Benevolent Fund (now Help Musicians UK), has run charities including the RVW Trust and Delius Trust
- Professor Nicola LeFanu – Composer, former professor of music at the University of York, daughter of Elizabeth Maconchy (who studied with Vaughan Williams)
- Sam Wigglesworth – Appointed 2024
- Harriet Wybor – Appointed 2024
- Raymond Yiu – Composer, appointed 2024

== Impact and legacy ==
The combined grants from the RVW Trust and Vaughan Williams Charitable Trust averaged £300,000 per annum, making them significant contributors to British musical life. The organisations supported music-making throughout the United Kingdom, with RVWT funding focusing particularly on new work and the performance and recording of unfamiliar British and Irish repertoire.

Sally Groves stated at the foundation's launch: "Ralph Vaughan Williams was the most quietly generous of men, with an unquenchable interest in all music. We are delighted that the Vaughan Williams Foundation will allow his generosity of spirit to continue and will benefit composers and performers well beyond the life of his musical copyrights."

== Related organisations ==
The Vaughan Williams Foundation should not be confused with:

- The Ralph Vaughan Williams Society (Charity 1156614) – A separate organisation that promotes understanding of Vaughan Williams's life and work through concerts, meetings, and publications, including the RVW Journal. The society also operates Albion Records as a recording subsidiary.
