= Helena Šrámková =

Czech painter (1883–1974)

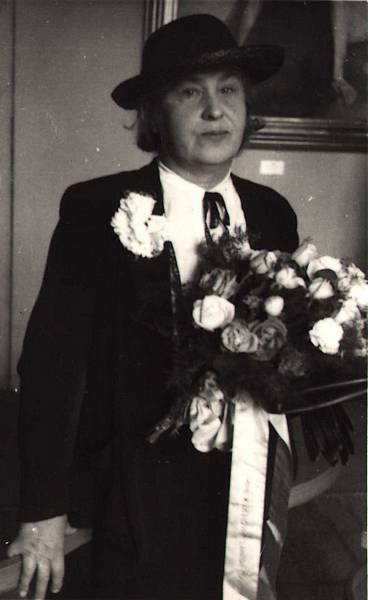
- Born: 23 January 1883; Sedlčany, Bohemia, Austria-Hungary
- Died: 26 February 1974 (aged 91); Jaroměř, Czechoslovakia
- Known for: Painting

Helena Šrámková (1883–1974) was a Czech painter and painting restorer.

== Early life ==
Šrámková was born on 23 January 1883 in Sedlčany in Bohemia of what was Austria-Hungary (now the Czech Republic). She was the youngest of three daughters of Josef Šrámek, a native of Smiřice, and his wife Františka, née Hrdličková. All three daughters received a good education, something unusual for girls at that time. The eldest, Amálie, studied piano and founded a music school in Bulgaria. The second, Olga, was one of the first women to graduate from the Faculty of Philosophy at the Charles Ferdinand University in Prague. As the youngest, Helena, was inclined towards painting from a young age. She studied at the School of Applied Arts in Prague with Professor Josef Schusser, who taught her the basics of composition, and then with the painter and teacher Jakub Schikaneder, from whom she learnt chiaroscuro. An admirer of the work of Antonín Slavíček, she sought his advice and he arranged for her to study landscape painting in Paris with Lucien Simon and Émile-René Ménard.

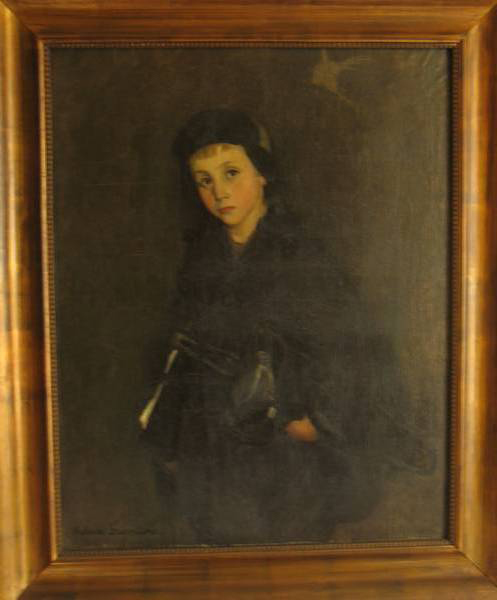
Adli

== Artistic career ==
Šrámková was a co-founder of the Circle of Female Artists in Prague, with whom she mainly exhibited. She was its chairwoman for seven years and then became an honorary member. In 1926, she was appointed a member of the advisory board for the Department of Fine Arts at the Ministry of Education and National Enlightenment. She was also a member of the Aleš Club of Fine Artists (KVU Aleš) and the Czech Fund of Fine Artists (ČFVU). Her work was sufficiently well respected for her to receive a scholarship to travel to Italy and Bulgaria, returning from Bulgaria, in particular, with many studies.

Šrámková painted mainly portraits and landscapes, using both watercolours and oils. She also restored damaged and darkened paintings. Her best-known painting is one of her nephew, Karel Fischer (Adli), when he was aged about ten, which won first prize in 1924 at the Paris Salon and was reproduced by the magazine Zlatá Praha.

== Exhibitions ==
Between 1915 and 1918, Šrámková exhibited at exhibitions of Czech artists in at the Mánes Union of Fine Arts in Prague, at Hradec Králové, at all of the member exhibitions of the Circle of Female Artists in Prague, in Olomouc, Košice (now in Slovakia), in Pilsen and in Kroměříž. In other countries, she exhibited at international exhibitions in Athens, at the Second International Watercolour Exhibition, held in Milan, at an exhibition of German artists in Vienna, at an international exhibition of women's art in Buenos Aires, among others.

In 1927 she was part of a group exhibition at the Fabre Gallery in Paris, and in 1936 at the Myslbek Pavilion in Prague. In February 1937, she was among those from Czechoslovakia to exhibit in Les femmes artistes d'Europe, the first international all-woman art show in France, held at the Jeu de Paume in Paris.

== Later life and death ==
For most of her life Šrámková lived in Smiřice. She also had a studio in Prague, which her father had purchased at the turn of the century. In her later years, she lived in poor circumstances and painted local people on commission to earn a living and maintain the house in Smiřice, which she looked after from the death in 1956 of her sister, Olga, until 1971. Her last surviving letter is dated February 1967, in which she complains to her nephew about her life, the lack of understanding of her art by the world, her loneliness and poverty. Reportedly, she would sometimes pay people such as doctors with paintings. She moved into a retirement home in Nový Hradec and died on 26 February 1974 in a hospital in Jaroměř. She is buried in the family tomb in Vyšehrad Cemetery in Prague, together with her parents. She had not married and had no children.

== Gallery ==
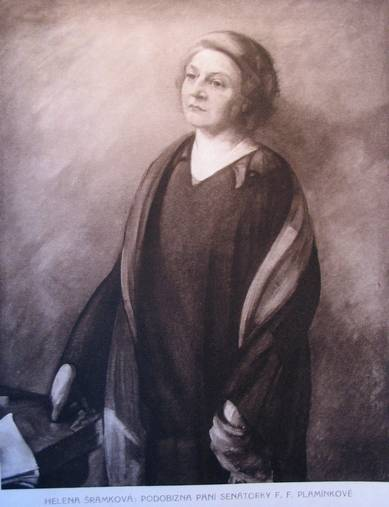

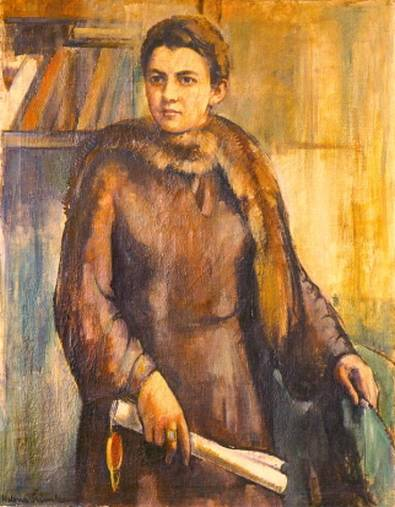

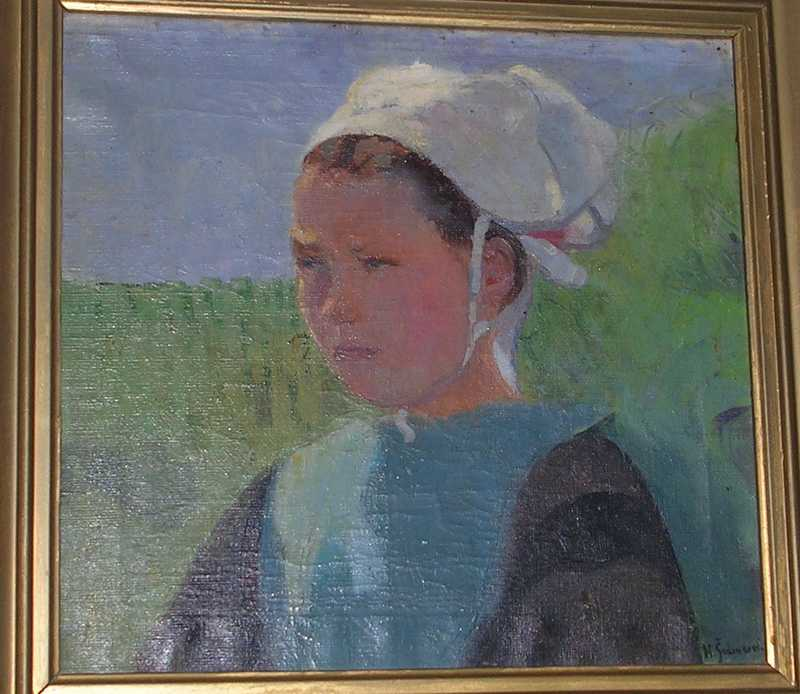

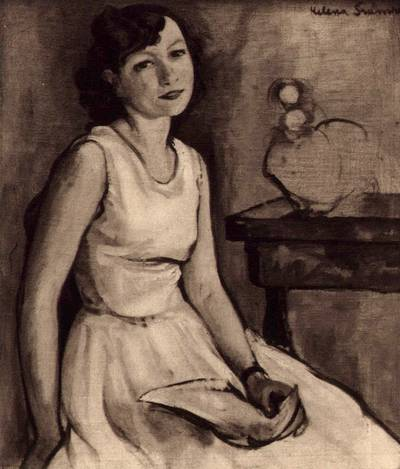

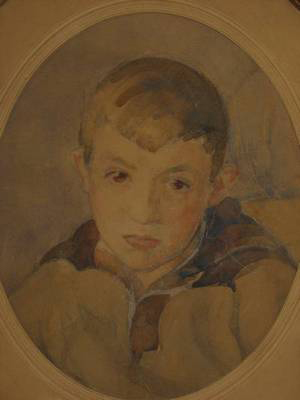

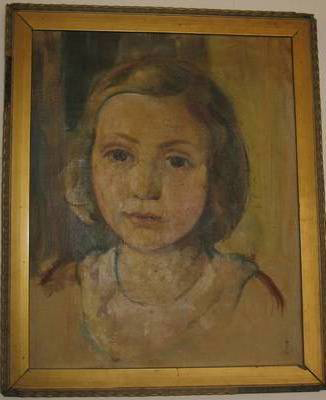

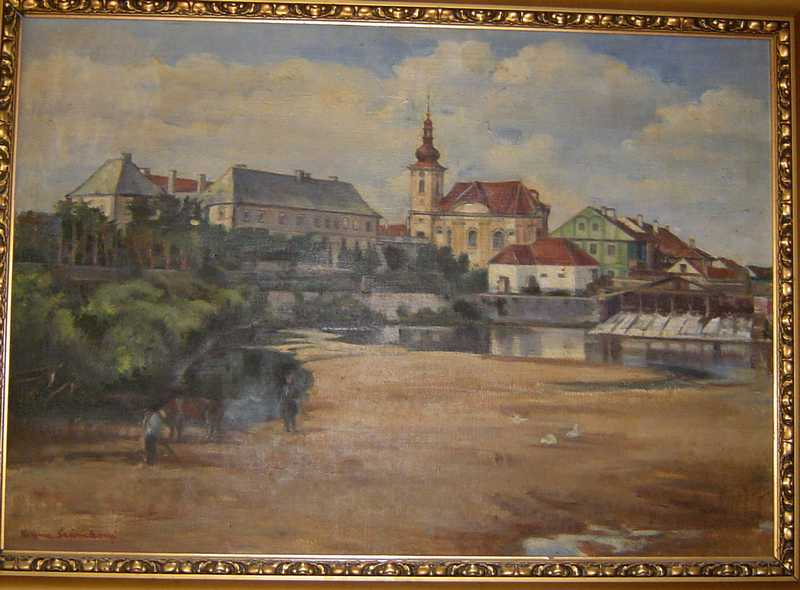

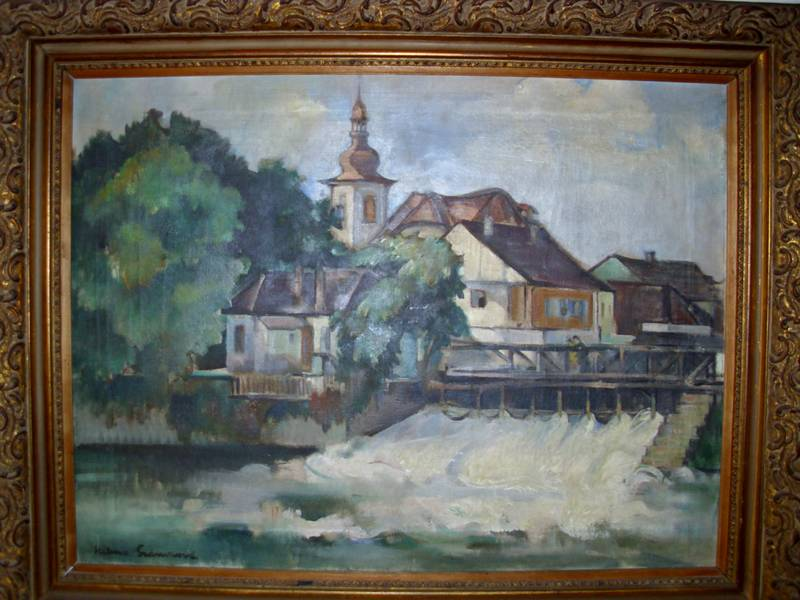

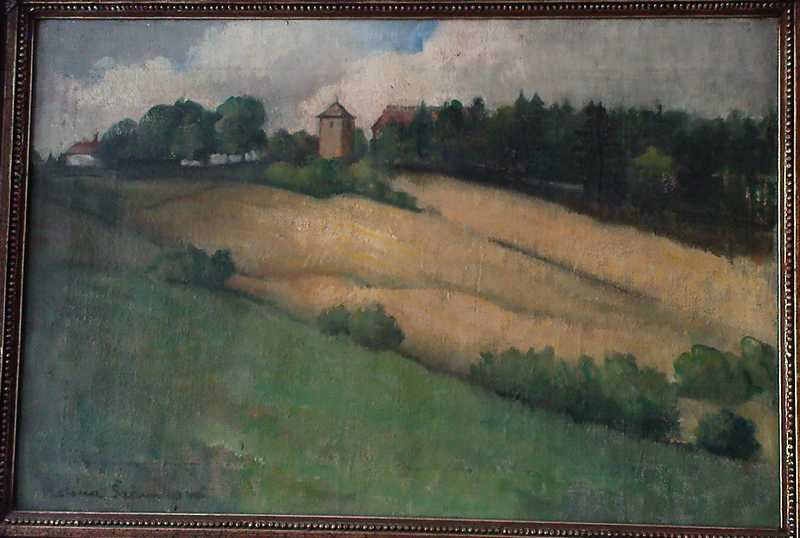

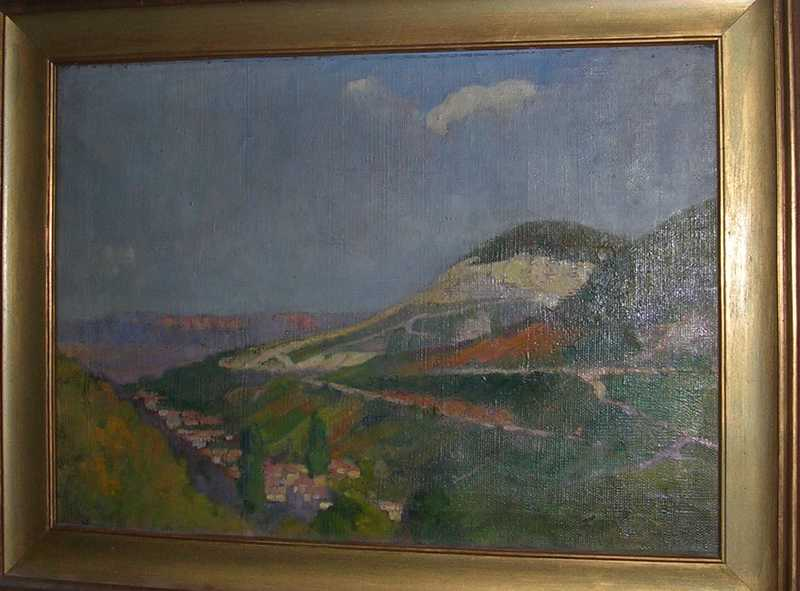
