= Linda S. Hirst =

British and American physicist

Linda Susan Hirst (also published as Linda Susan Matkin) is a British and American condensed matter physicist whose research concerns liquid crystals, soft matter, active matter, and the physical behavior of biological structures at the subcellular level. She is a professor of physics at the University of California, Merced.

== Education and career ==
Hirst is originally from Liverpool. She received both a bachelor's degree with first-class honours in 1998 and a Ph.D. in physics from the University of Manchester, completing her Ph.D. in 2001 with a dissertation on liquid crystals.

After postdoctoral research at the University of California, Santa Barbara, she joined the Florida State University faculty before moving to her present position at UC Merced in 2008.

== Textbook ==
Hirst is the author of the textbook Fundamentals of Soft Matter Science (CRC Press, 2013; 2nd ed., 2020).

== Recognition ==
Hirst was the 2019 recipient of the Hilsum Medal of the British Liquid Crystal Society. She was elected in 2021 as a Fellow of the American Physical Society (APS), after a nomination from the APS Division of Soft Matter, "for fundamental experimental studies of the phases and dynamics of synthetic, biological, and biologically inspired membranes and liquid crystal materials".
