= Ingolf Huhn =

German theatre manager

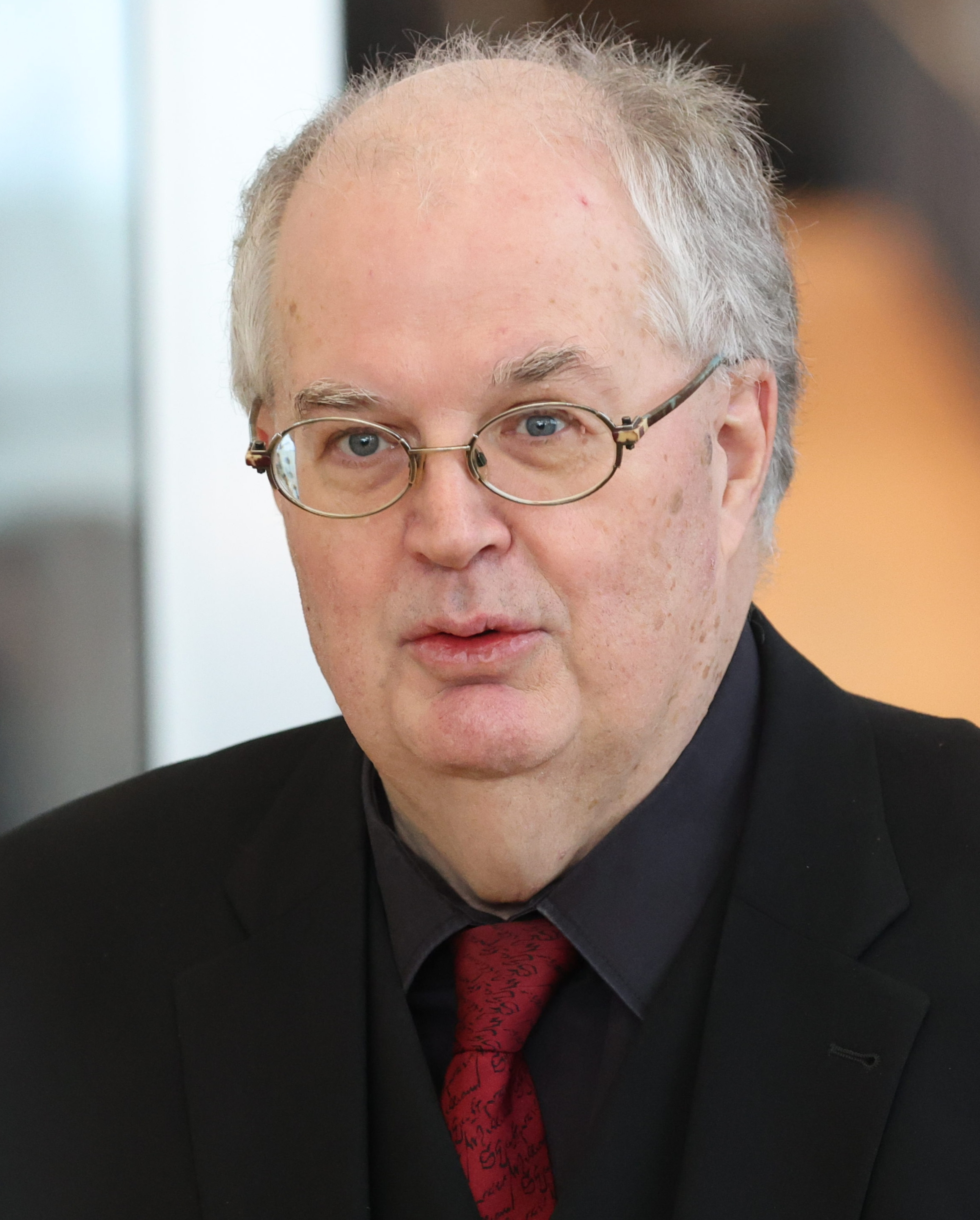
Ingolf Huhn (2024)

Ingolf Huhn (born in 1955) is a German opera manager and theatre director.

== Life ==
Born in Magdeburg, after the Abitur Huhn studied opera direction in Berlin, musicology in Leipzig and theology. Afterwards he was a master student at the Academy of Arts with Ruth Berghaus. He then worked for ten years as an opera director at the Meiningen Court Theatre. During this period he was also a frequent guest director at the Graz Opera in Styria/Austria. From 1998 to 2003 Huhn worked as the artistic director of the Mittelächsisches Theater in Freiberg and Döbeln. From 2003 to 2008 he held the position of General Director of the Theater Plauen-Zwickau.

On 1 January 2010 Huhn succeeded Hans-Hermann Krug as managing director of the Eduard-von-Winterstein-Theater in Annaberg-Buchholz.

== Publications ==
- Wagners Öffentlichkeitssyndrom.
- Richard Wagners soziales Theaterkonzept : Untersuchungen zu Wagners Entwurf eines gesellschaftlich relevanten Theaters.
