= Otto Brückwald =

German architect

Otto Brückwald (6 May 1841 - 15 February 1917) was a German architect.

== Life and work ==
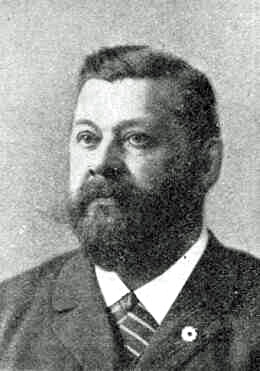
Otto Brückwald

Paul Otto Brückwald was born in Leipzig, the youngest of the four children of Carl Friedrich Brückwald and his wife Emilie Pauline, née Cagiorgi. In 1857 Otto Brückwald was apprenticed to a bricklayer and due to a scholarship, he was able attend an academy. From 1860 until 1863 he attended the Royal Academy in Dresden. In 1868 he joined the Masonic Lodge "Minerva zu den drei Palmen" in Leipzig.

The most important buildings, with whose construction he was involved, include the "Neues Theater" in Leipzig (1864-1868), which was designed by Carl Ferdinand Langhans and destroyed during World War II, for which he undertook the detailed planning and the construction site management. Furthermore, he was responsible for the "Hoftheater" in Altenburg (1869–1871) and the Bayreuth Festspielhaus (1872–1876). He also constructed various buildings in Leipzig.

Otto Brückwald died aged 75 on 15 February 1917, in Leipzig.
