= Henri Hinrichsen =

German music publisher and patron of music

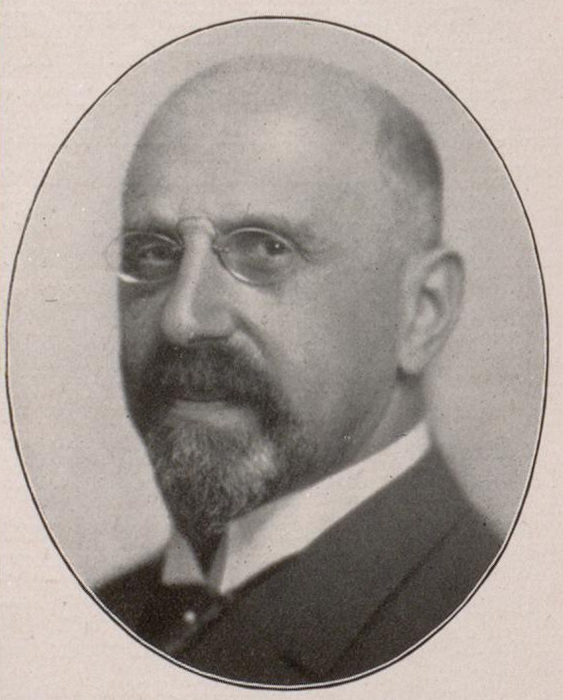
- Born: 5 February 1868; Hamburg, North German Confederation
- Died: 17 September 1942 (aged 74); Auschwitz-Birkenau, German-occupied Poland
- Occupation: Music publisher
- Organizations: C. F. Peters; Hochschule für Frauen zu Leipzig; University of Leipzig
- Awards: Honorary doctorate

Henri Hinrichsen (5 February 1868 – 17 September 1942) was a German music publisher and patron of music in Leipzig. He directed the music publishing house C. F. Peters, succeeding his uncle. He helped found the Hochschule für Frauen zu Leipzig, the first academy for women in Germany, and financed the acquisition of a collection of musical instruments by the University of Leipzig. He was murdered at the Auschwitz concentration camp.

== Career ==
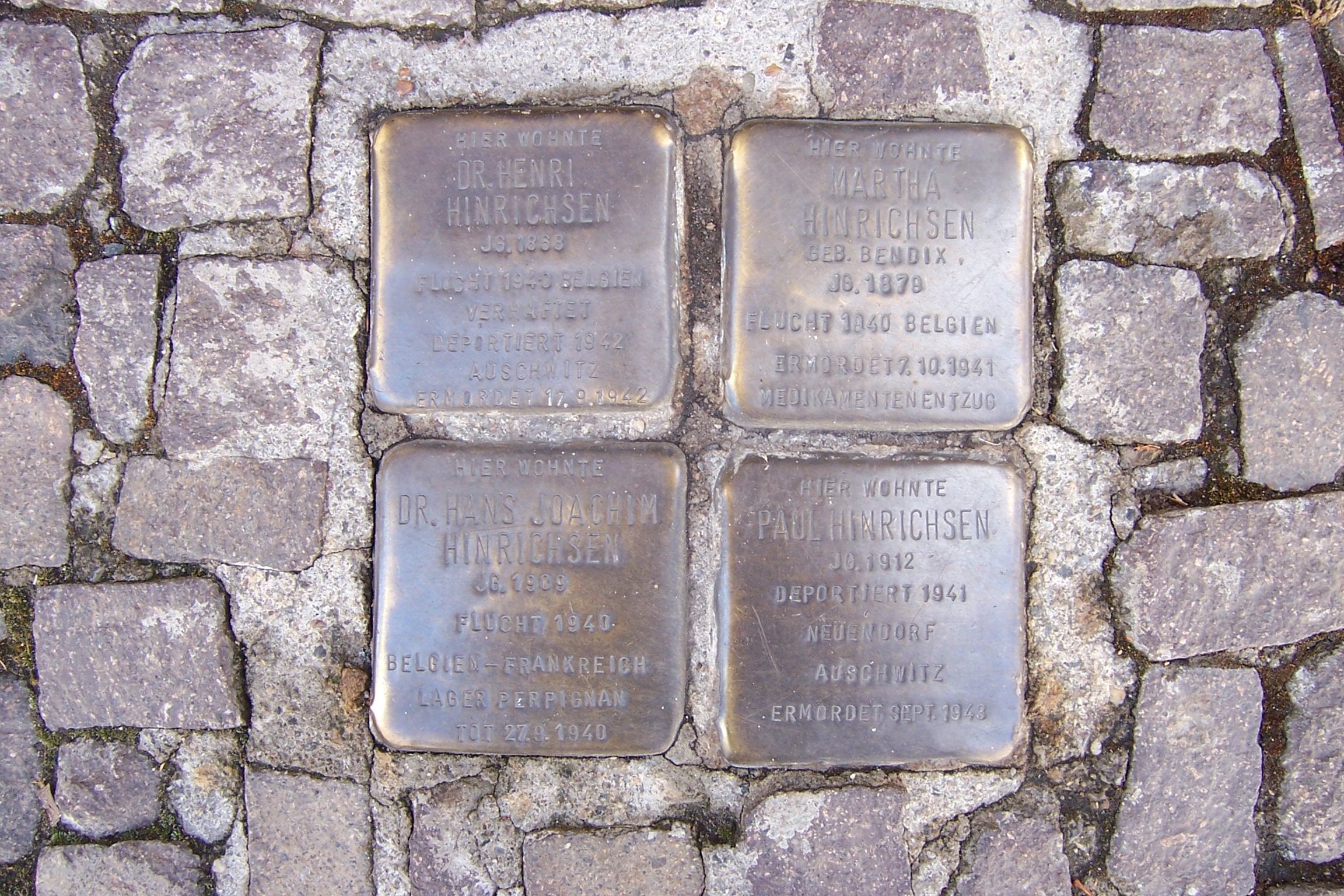
Stolpersteine for the Hinrichsen family in front of the Musikbibliothek Peters in Leipzig

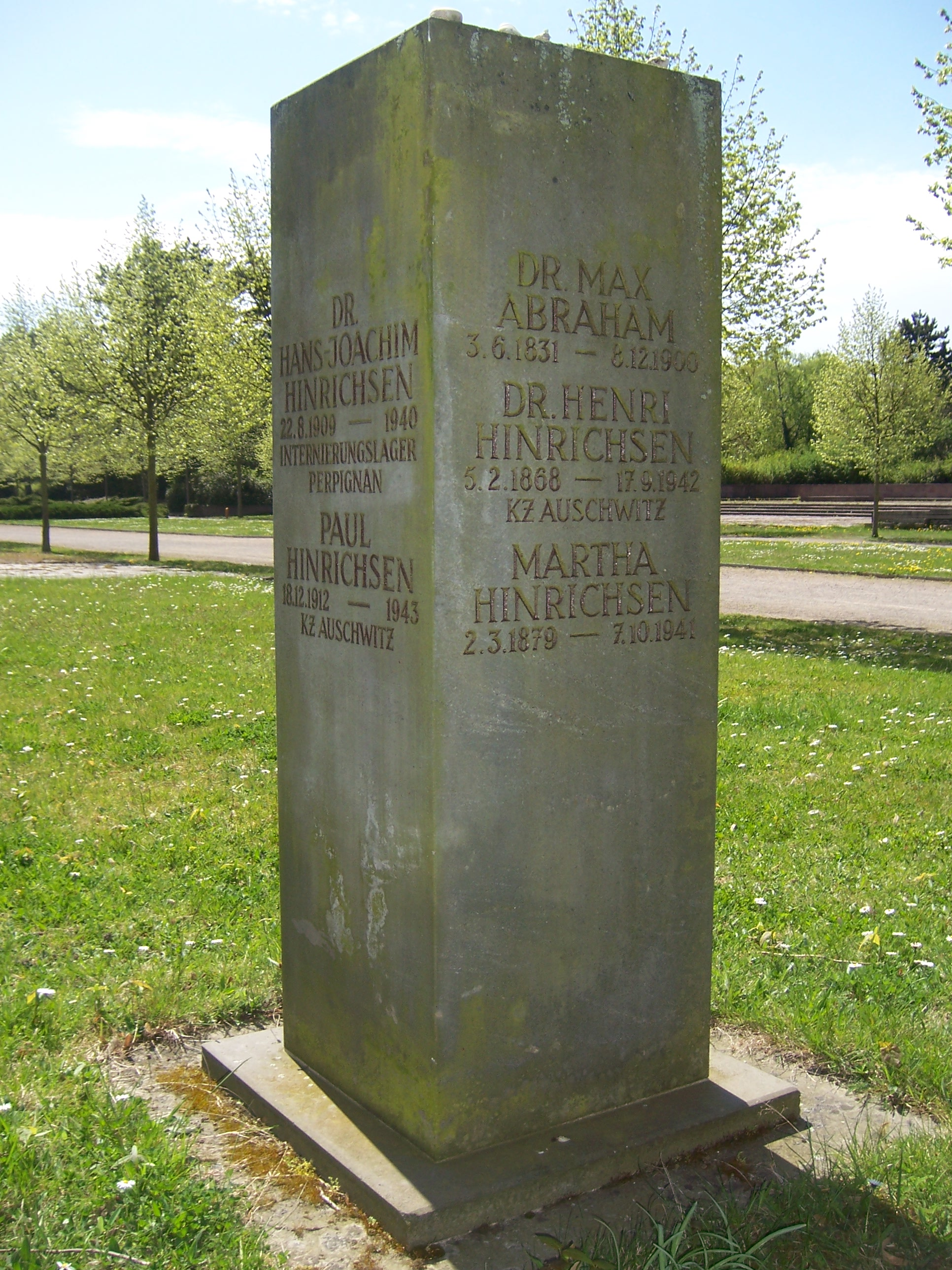
Memorial for Dr. Henri Hinrichsen and family at the Südfriedhof in Leipzig

Born in Hamburg, Hinrichsen trained to be a music seller and publisher in Leipzig, Basel, Brussels and London. He married Martha (née Bendix, 1879–1941) in 1898. The couple had two daughters and five sons.

Hinrichsen worked from 15 May 1891 for the music publisher C. F. Peters, which belonged to his uncle Max Abraham. On 1 January 1894, he became a part owner and after the suicide of his uncle in 1900 was the sole director of the publishing house. He published works by his contemporaries, such as Johannes Brahms and Edvard Grieg, who was his friend and had a room on the upper floor of the building which housed both the business and the family. He was the first to add works by Gustav Mahler, Hans Pfitzner, Max Reger, Arnold Schönberg and Hugo Wolf to the house's products, and in 1932, he acquired the rights to seven early tone poems by Richard Strauss. He introduced critical editions called Urtext.

Hinrichsen was a Geheimer Kommerzienrat, Handelsrichter and Stadtverordneter in Leipzig. He was awarded an honorary doctorate by the University of Leipzig in 1929.

In 1911, Hinrichsen was a patron of the Hochschule für Frauen zu Leipzig, the first academy for women in Germany, founded by Henriette Goldschmidt (1825–1920), whose work he supported. In 1921, it was continued as the Sozialpädagisches Frauenseminar by the city of Leipzig but still financially sponsored by Hinrichsen. In 1926, he donated 200,000 Reichsmarks to the University of Leipzig to enable it to acquire a collection of musical instruments (Musikinstrumenten-Sammlung Wilhelm Heyer) from Cologne. It became the foundation of today's Museum of Musical Instruments of Leipzig University.

Hinrichsen was a patriotic German who had been recognized by Wilhelm II, the German emperor.

== Nazi persecution and murder 1933-1942 ==
When the Nazis came to power in Germany in 1933, he was persecuted as a Jew. In 1938, his publishing house was Aryanized, that is transferred to a non-Jewish owner. In 1940, he travelled to Brussels and applied for visas to try to get to Britain and the United States. On January 11, 1940, he was forced to relinquish to Hitler's art dealer Hildebrand Gurlitt his Pissarro painting, Sower And Ploughman, however he still did not receive a visa. His wife died in Brussels on 7 October 1941, because as a Jew she could not get insulin to treat her diabetes. Hinrichsen was deported to the Auschwitz concentration camp, where he was murdered on 17 September 1942.

== Family ==
His son Max Hinrichsen (1901–1965) emigrated in the 1930s and founded the Peters Edition in London. His other son, Walter Hinrichsen (1907–1969), left Germany in 1936 and founded the C.F. Peters Corporation in New York City.

== Awards and honors ==
On 29 May 1929, Hinrichsen received an honorary doctorate from the Philosophical Faculty of the University of Leipzig. In 1949, Arnold Schoenberg dedicated a revised version of his Fünf Orchesterstücke, Op. 16, to his memory: "This new edition is dedicated to the memory of Henri Hinrichsen, a music publisher who was a great seigneur." After the grave monument of the Abraham/Hinrichsen family in the Südfriedhof was razed in the 1980s, a statue recalling the former location was erected in 1992. A bust of Hinrichsen is displayed in a staircase of the Grassi Museum in Leipzig. In 2001, a street in Leipzig's Waldstraßenviertel was named after him.

== Claim for Nazi-looted art ==
In 2013, drawing that had belonged to Hinrichsen, "Klavierspiel" (Playing the Piano) by Carl Spitzweg, was discovered in the stash of artworks hoarded by the son of Hitler's art dealer Hildebrand Gurlitt in Munich in 2013. It was restituted to Hinrichsen's heirs by the Museum of Fine Arts in Bern, that had received part of the Gurlitt collection after his death.

Property looted by Nazis from Hinrichsen, including artworks, are being searched for.

== Literature ==
- Irene Lawford-Hinrichsen: Music Publishing and Patronage - C. F. Peters: 1800 to the Holocaust. London: Edition Press 2000 ISBN 0953611205
- Sophie Fetthauer: Musikverlage im "Dritten Reich" und im Exil. (Musik im "Dritten Reich" und im Exil, vol. 10) Von Bockel Verlag Hamburg 2004 ISBN 3-932696-52-2
- Irene Lawford-Hinrichsen; Norbert Molkenbur: C. F. Peters - ein deutscher Musikverlag im Leipziger Kulturleben. Zum Wirken von Max Abraham und Henri Hinrichsen. In: Ephraim-Carlebach-Stiftung (ed.): Judaica Lipsiensia: Zur Geschichte der Juden in Leipzig. Leipzig: Edition Leipzig, 1994. pp. 92–109
- Irene Lawford-Hinrichsen: Five Hundred Years to Auschwitz : A Family Odyssey from the Inquisition to the Present. Bertrams 2008. ISBN 0953611213.
- Annerose Kemp; Eberhard Ulm: Henriette-Goldschmidt-Schule 1911–2011. Leipzig 2011.

== See also ==
- Aryanization
- List of claims for restitution
- The Holocaust
