= Richard Petzoldt =

German musicologist

Richard Johannes Petzoldt (12 November 1907 – 14 January 1974) was a German musicologist and music critic.

== Life ==
Petzoldt was born in Plauen in 1907 as the son of a merchant and grew up in Berlin. After graduating from high school, he studied musicology at the Friedrich Wilhelms University with Johannes Wolf, Hermann Abert, Arnold Schering, Hans Joachim Moser, Friedrich Blume, Erich von Hornbostel, Curt Sachs and Georg Schünemann. In 1933, he received his PhD from Arnold Schering with his dissertation The church compositions and secular cantatas of Reinhard Keiser.

From 1934 he worked as an editor for the Allgemeine Musikzeitung in Berlin, later Leipzig. In 1939 he became their chief editor. He also wrote for the Berliner Tageblatt. From 1940 to 1945 he did military service. After the Second World War he worked as a music critic for various newspapers and magazines and as an employee of the Cultural Office of the City of Leipzig. In 1945 he was briefly director of the municipal music library in Leipzig. He took over the rebuilding and provisional management of the Institute of Musicology of the University of Leipzig and the Museum of Musical Instruments of Leipzig University. From 1946 to 1952 he taught music history at the University of Music and Theatre Leipzig. From 1949 he was also dramaturg at the Leipzig Opera and editor-in-chief of the magazine Musik in der Schule.

In 1952 he became professor with a teaching assignment for music history and director of the Institute for Music Education and deputy director of the Institute for Musicology at the University of Leipzig. In 1967 he became director of the Museum of Musical Instruments and in 1969 full professor of musicology in the section of cultural studies and German studies. In 1973 he became Emeritus.

Petzoldt died in Leipzig in 1974 at the age of 66. He is buried at the Leipziger Südfriedhof.

== Publications ==
- Ludwig van Beethoven. (1938)
- Johann Sebastian Bach (Neuaufl., 1950)
- Franz Schubert – Sein Leben in Bildern. (1953)
- Peter Tschaikowski – Sein Leben in Bildern. (1953)
- Die Oper in ihrer Zeit. (1956)
- Giuseppe Verdi (new edition, 1959)
- Geschichte der Musikerziehung (1962)
- Der Leipziger Thomanerchor.(1962)
- Wegweiser zur Musik. (1962)
- Georg Friedrich Händel : sein Leben in Bildern. (1965)

== Literature ==
- Gabriele Baumgartner: Petzoldt, Richard. In Gabriele Baumgartner, Dieter Hebig (ed.): Biographisches Handbuch der SBZ/DDR. 1945–1990. Volume 2: Maassen – Zylla. K. G. Saur, Munich 1997, ISBN 3-598-11177-0, pp. 639–640.
