= Ernst Hermann Meyer =

German musicologist and composer

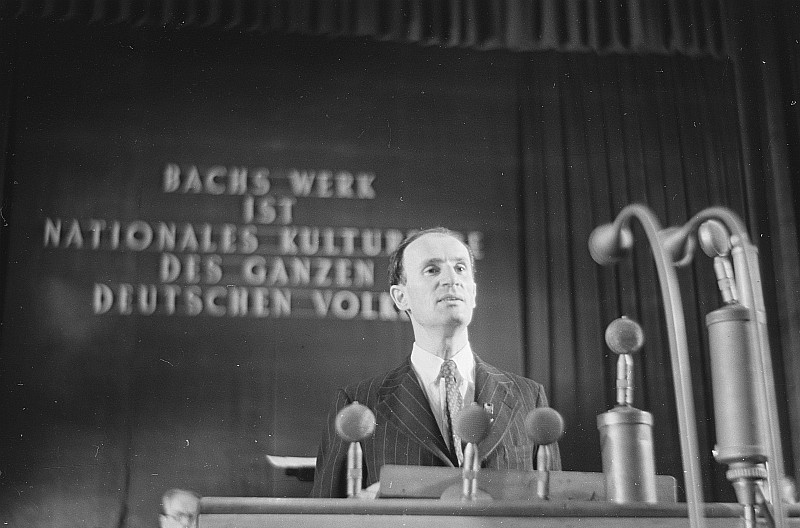
Ernst Hermann Meyer

Ernst Hermann Ludimar Meyer (8 December 1905 – 8 October 1988) was a German composer and musicologist, noted for his expertise on seventeenth-century English chamber music.

== Life ==
Meyer was born in Berlin. He received his first piano lessons at the age of six and started composing at eleven. After finishing school, he worked as an apprentice at a bank, and in 1926 he started the advanced study of music at Heidelberg University, where in 1930 he completed his Ph.D. on the 17th-century chamber music of North German composers. He became a pupil of Hanns Eisler and under his influence, joined the Communist Party. Being a Jew and the composer of militant protest songs, he emigrated to the United Kingdom in 1933 to avoid detention by the Nazi Party. There he eventually became a close friend of leftist composer Alan Bush, who was also in contact with exiled composers Eisler and Kurt Weill.

In the UK, Meyer researched English chamber music of the 17th century, lectured for the Workers Educational Association and conducted the Labour Choral Union. In 1939 he began lecturing at Bedford College, London; in 1945 he was given a guest professorship at King's College, Cambridge. But unlike some of his fellow émigré composers (such as Hans May), Meyer only ever worked on the fringes of British cinema, for which he produced some scores for documentaries and instructional films. He did some unique work on the use of sound effects, dubbing and editing.

Meyer returned to East Germany (GDR) in 1948 and became one of the most influential figures of music culture there. He was active politically as a communist, and his works include choral, orchestral, and chamber music written to display commitment to Marxist–Leninist ideals. In 1982 the second edition of his book Early English Chamber Music: The History of a Great Tradition from the Middle Ages to Purcell was published.

Meyer was head of the German Society of Composers and Musicologists, professor of musicology at Berlin's Humboldt University, chairman of the German Handel Society, and founder of the annual Handel Festival, which is still celebrated in Halle, Germany.

== Works ==
Meyer composed numerous songs, as well as chamber music, two symphonies and other works for orchestra, an opera, and an oratorio. He wrote numerous musicological articles as well as a book on English chamber music. His pupils included Serge Hovey. As a musicologist, he edited numerous manuscripts by English composers of the Tudor and Renaissance periods (for example, Englische Fantasien aus dem 17. Jahrhundert : für drei Streichinstrumente = English fantasias from the 17th century : for three string instruments OCLC 2757300).

=== Selected Compositions ===
Among more than 300 songs, orchestral works, and other works:

- Mansfeld Oratorio (1950)
- String Quartet in G, Nr. 1 (1956)
- String Symphony (1958)
- String Quartet Nr. 2 (1959)
- Poem, for Viola and Orchestra (1961)
- Concerto for Violin and Orchestra (1964)
- Symphony in B♭ (1967)
- String Quartet Nr. 3 (1967)
- Concerto for Harp and Chamber Orchestra (1968)
- Leinefelder Divertimento (1969)
- Toccata for Orchestra (1971)
- Reiter der Nacht, opera (1972)
- Concerto for Viola and Orchestra (1978)
- Sonata for Viola and Piano (1979)
- Essay for Viola Solo (1983)

=== Selected books ===
Among many papers and essays:

- Die mehrstimmigie Spielmusik des 17. Jahrhunderts in Nord- und Mitteleuropa, Heidelberg 1930
- English Chamber Music: The History of a Great Art from the Middle Ages to Purcell, London 1946 (OCLC 420311)
