= Walther Siegmund-Schultze =

German musicologist

Siegmund-Schultze in 1954

Walther Siegmund-Schultze (6 July 1916 – 6 March 1993) was a German musicologist. He was the elder brother of musicologist Hella Brock.

== Biography ==
Siegmund-Schultze was born in Schweinitz (Elster). In July 1940 he was promoted to Dr. phil. at the Philosophical Faculty of Universität Breslau with Mozarts Vokal- und Instrumentalmusik in ihren motivisch-thematischen Beziehungen under Franz Arnold Schmitz. Siegmund-Schultze was co-founder of the Halle Handel Festival in 1952 and in 1955 of the Georg Friedrich Handel Society. From 1965 to 1970 he was Professor of Musicology in Leipzig. From 1956 to 1981 he was Professor and director of the Institute for Musicology at the Martin Luther University of Halle-Wittenberg. He died in Halle (Saale).

== Awards ==
- 1959 Handel Prize
- 1987 Telemann Prize
