= Gavin Higgins =

British composer (born 1983)

- Born: 18 April 1983 (age 43); Gloucester, England
- Genres: Classical, Contemporary Classical
- Occupation: Composer
- Website: gavinhiggins.com

Gavin Higgins (born in 1983) is a British composer who resides in London.

== Early life and education ==
Higgins was born in Gloucestershire and grew up in the Forest Of Dean. There, he started his education in music, due to his family's membership of a local brass band. His first instrument was the cornet, which he started learning during infancy. He also played the tenor horn.

At 16, Higgins went to Chetam's School of Music in Manchester on a scholarship. He then studied French horn and composition at the Royal Northern College of Music.

Higgins has a history of coal miners and brass band musicians in his family, the fact of which was inspiration for his ballet, Dark Arteries, for brass band and dance ensemble, based on the Miners Strike of 1984-85.

== Career ==
After moving to London, Higgins became the inaugural Music Fellow for Rambert Dance Company in 2010.

He also wrote music for What Wild Ecstasy (2012), and Dark Arteries (2016), both ballets created in collaboration with then Rambert Artistic Director, Mark Baldwin. What Wild Escstasy was commissioned as part of PRS for Music Foundation's 'New Music 20x12 scheme', in association with the 2012 Olympics. Dark Arteries was commissioned to commemorate the 30 year anniversary of the 1984-85 UK miners' strike and was inspired by the events of the strike and as well as Higgins' mining-linked heritage.

Higgins has written three pieces for the BBC Proms, Der Aufstand (2012), Velocity (which opened the Last night of the Proms 2014) and most recently Rough Voices (2020). He has also composed a trombone concerto, The Book of Miracles for the BBC Symphony Orchestra, premiered in early 2019.

The Royal Opera House commissioned Higgins and author Francesca Simon to write an Opera based on Simon's book The Monstrous Child about the teenage Norse god of the dead, Hel. Higgins wrote the music for the opera, while Simon wrote the libretto. The opera premiered in 2019 in the Linbury theatre at the Royal Opera House.

In 2020 Gavin was appointed the Composer in Association for the BBC National Orchestra of Wales.

== Selected works ==
=== Solo ===
- Three Broken Love Songs (2006) - for clarinet and piano
- Urban Fairy Tales (2009) - solo piano
- Kathedrale (2013) - solo accordion
- A Quiet Grief (2020) - solo horn

=== Chamber ===
- Atomic Cafe (2012) - for ensemble.
- The Ruins of Detroit (2013) - piano trio
- Gursky Landscapes (2018) - string quintet
- Ekstasis (2019) - string sextet

=== Orchestral ===
- Der Aufstand (2012)
- Velocity (2014)
- The Book of Miracles: Trombone Concerto (2019)
- While Time Quietly Kills Them – revised (2020)
- Rough Voices (2020)
- Concerto Grosso for Brass Band and Orchestra (2022)
- Sarabande (2023)
- A Monstrous Little Suite (2024) (from The Monstrous Child)

=== Ballet and opera ===
- What Wild Ecstasy (2012) - Ballet
- Dark Arteries (2016) - Ballet with brass band
- The Monstrous Child (2019) - Opera

=== Brass and wind ===
- Freaks (2007)
- Fanfares and Love Songs (2009)
- Destroy, Trample, As Swiftly As She (2011)
- Prophecies (2017)
- A Dark Arteries Suite (2017)
- So Spoke Albion (2022)

== Awards ==
In 2019 Higgins won an Ivor Novello Award at The Ivors Composer Awards in the orchestral category for his trombone concerto, Book of Miracles. His Concerto Grosso for Brass Band and Orchestra was recognized with a Royal Philharmonic Society Award in 2023 for best large-scale composition.

Gavin Higgins was the winner of 2023's Sky Arts Award for classical music for his Concerto Grosso for Brass Band and Orchestra.

In 2024 Higgins was nominated for an Ivor Novello Award at The Ivors Classical Awards. His Horn Concerto was nominated for Best Orchestral Composition in association with Dorico. It has been recorded. Higgins went on to win the Ivor Novello Award on 12 November 2024.
