= Christoph Sramek =

German music critic and music historian (born 1950)

Christoph Sramek (born 6 September 1950) is a German music historian and music critic.

== Life ==
Born in Chemnitz, Sramek passed his Abitur in 1969 in Burgstädt. He also obtained a skilled worker degree as bricklayer.

From 1969 to 1973 he studied music education and German studies at the Leipzig University. His teachers included Richard Petzoldt and Werner Wolf in music history, Hansgeorg Mühe in music theory and Werner Buschnakowski in piano. Bezirksverband Leipzig. Leipzig 1982, p. 62. His diploma thesis with Gerd Schönfelder as subject teacher deals with the topic Möglichkeiten aleatorischer musikalischer Gestaltungsweisen für das Musiktheater – untersucht an Fritz Geißlers "Zerbrochenem Krug". From 1973 to 1976 he was a teacher at the Polytechnic High School in Burgstädt. He also taught stenography at the Extended Secondary School.

From 1976 to 1979 he was an aspirant for musicology at the University of Leipzig. In 1980 he was awarded a doctorate by Udo Klement with the dissertation Studien zur Klangfarbe – unter Einbeziehung von Beispielen aus der Orchestermusik der DDR in den siebziger Jahren. From 1980 to 1988 he worked as an assistant in the research group Instrumental Music of the GDR and was temporarily head of the study department of the section for cultural and art studies. He began the Habilitation thesis Beziehungen zur Harmonik – ausgehend von Orchestermusikwerken Sachsens in den 1980er Jahren '(Relationships to Harmonics - based on orchestral music works of Saxony in the 1980s), which he did not complete. In 1988 he received the teaching qualification. From 1988 to 1989 he also studied at the Charles University. Sramek taught from 1978 to 1997 at the Institute for Musicology at the Leipzig University.

From 1994 to 2015 he held a teaching position. From 2000 to 2003 he was twice deputy professor. In 2001 he was appointed Honorary Professor for historical musicology at the Institute of Musicology of the University of Music and Theatre Leipzig.

He works as a freelancer for the Mitteldeutscher Rundfunk. He also works as a music critic for music magazines such as Musik und Kirche, Üben und Musizieren, Das Orchester as well as the Freie Presse and the Ostthüringer Zeitung. He wrote several CD booklets in the field of New Music and published composer portraits for the music publisher Breitkopf & Härtel. Sramek is a member of the board of the Sächsischer Musikbund.

== Publications ==
- Studien zur Klangfarbe – unter Einbeziehung von Beispielen aus der Orchestermusik der DDR in den siebziger Jahren. 2 volumes, Leipzig 1980. (zugleich Dissertation, Universität Leipzig 1980)
- with Allmuth Behrendt: Prof. Dr. Johannes Forner: „Durchdachte Poesien“ – die späten Klavierzyklen von Brahms. Abschiedsvorlesung am Freitag, dem 25. Januar 2002, Hochschule für Musik und Theater „Felix Mendelssohn Bartholdy“ Leipzig, Hauptgebäude, Kammermusiksaal. Hochschule für Musik und Theater, Leipzig 2002.
- die töne haben mich geblendet. Festschrift zum 60. Geburtstag des Dresdner Komponisten Jörg Herchet. Kamprad, Altenburg 2003, ISBN 3-930550-28-8.
- Musik mit Klangsinnlich keit und konstruktivem Kalkül. Eine Dokumentation anlässlich des 70. Geburtstages von Siegfried Thiele. Künstlerisches Betriebsbüro der Hochschule für Musik und Theater, Leipzig 2004.
- Dokumentation zum Leben und Schaffen des Leipziger Musikwissenschaftlers, Hochschullehrers und Musikkritikers Prof. Dr. sc. Werner Wolf anläßlich seines 80. Geburtstags am 15. März 2005. Leipzig 2005.
- Thomas Buchholz. Skizzenblätter zu Leben und Werk des halleschen Komponisten. Verlag Neue Musik, Berlin 2011, ISBN 978-3-7333-0809-4.
- (ed.): "Im Lichtstrom versunken nun sonnenhaft": Dokumente zum Schaffen des Dresdner Komponisten Jörg Herchet. Kamprad, Altenburg 2013, ISBN 978-3-930550-75-3.
- with Wolfgang Orf: „Töne befragen – ihr Sosein erkunden“. Siegfried Thiele Werkeverzeichnis (ThWV): eine Dokumentation zu Leben und Schaffen des Leipziger Komponisten. Kamprad, Altenburg 2017, ISBN 978-3-95755-613-4.
- (ed.): „im teil ist das ganze verborgen“. Dokumente zum Werk des Komponisten Jörg Herchet und seines Textautors Jörg Milbradt. Jörg Milbradt zum 75. Geburtstag gewidmet. Kamprad, Altenburg 2018, ISBN 978-3-95755-623-3.
