= Edition Peters =

Classical music publisher in Leipzig, Germany

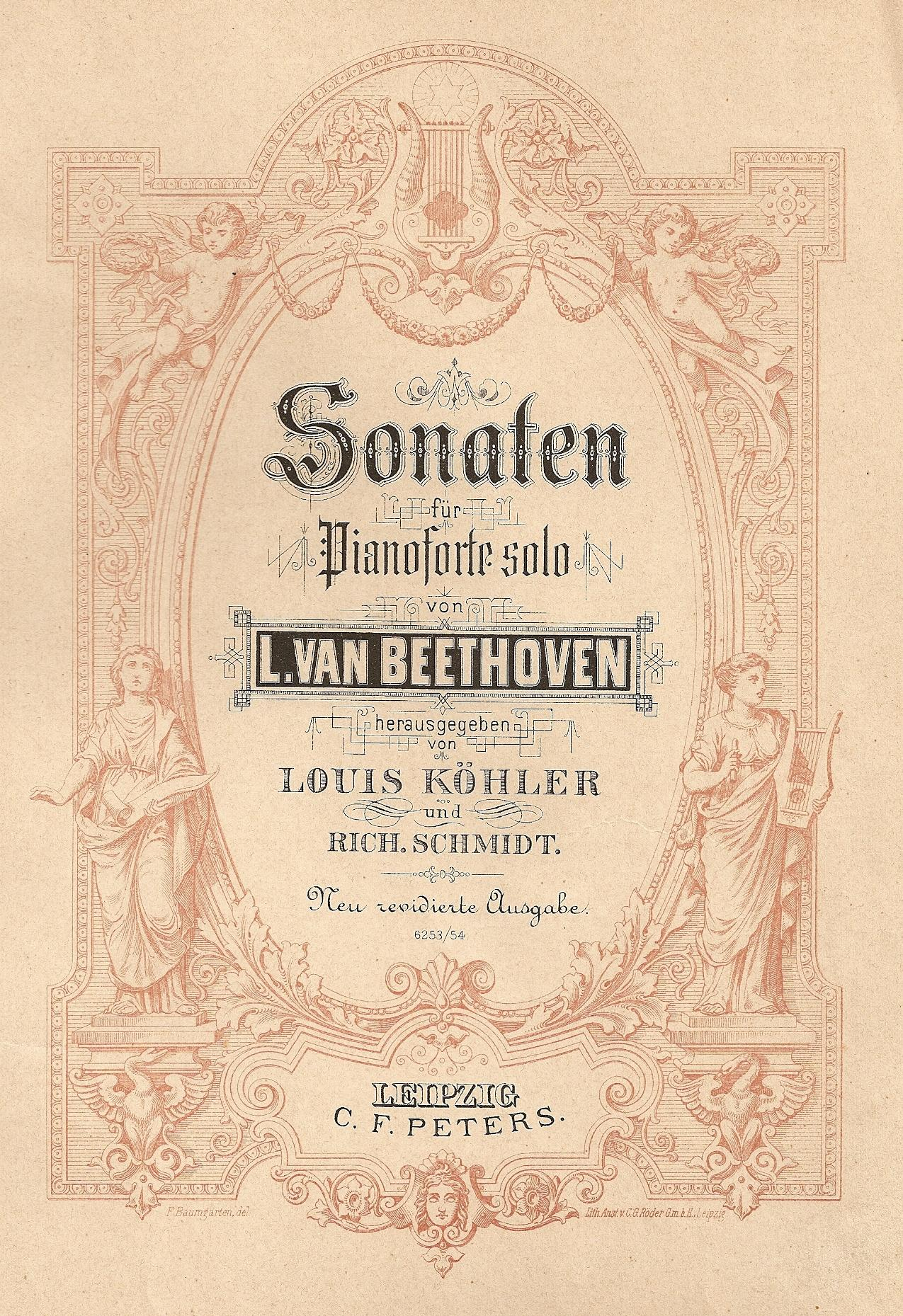
- An Edition Peters title page of an old bound volume of Beethoven's piano sonatas.
- Founded: 1800
- Founder: Franz Anton Hoffmeister and Ambrosius Kühnel
- Country of origin: Germany
- Headquarters location: Leipzig
- Publication types: sheet music
- Official website: www.editionpeters.com

Edition Peters is a classical music publisher founded in Leipzig, Germany in 1800.

== History ==
The company came into being on 1 December 1800 when the Viennese composer Franz Anton Hoffmeister (1754–1812) and the local organist Ambrosius Kühnel (1770–1813) opened a concern in Leipzig known as the "Bureau de Musique." Along with publishing, the new firm included an engraving and printing works and a retail shop for selling printed music and instruments. Among its earliest publications were collections of chamber music works by Haydn and Mozart. When Hoffmeister departed for Vienna in 1805, the firm had already issued several works by the then new Viennese composer, Ludwig van Beethoven (Opp. 19–22; 39–42). Kühnel continued publishing new works, adding those of composers Daniel Gottlob Türk, Václav Tomášek, and Louis Spohr, all of whom went on to have a long relationship with the firm.

After Kühnel's death, the enterprise was sold to Carl Friedrich Peters (1779–1827), a Leipzig bookseller. Despite difficulties arising from the aftermath of the War of the Sixth Coalition and depression, Peters added new works by Weber, Hummel, Klengel, and Ries to the catalog along with his name (now "Bureau de Musique C. F. Peters") before his death. The next owner was a manufacturer, Carl Gotthelf Siegmund Böhme (1785–1855), who published many works of J. S. Bach after the revival of interest in his work with the assistance of Carl Czerny, Siegfried Dehn, Friedrich Konrad Griepenkerl and Moritz Hauptmann. Ownership of the company was transferred to a charity run by the City of Leipzig for a short period after Böhme's death (1855–1860).

The company was then sold to a Berlin music and book retailer, Julius Friedländer, on 21 April 1860. By 1863, Friedländer took on a partner, Dr. Max Abraham (1831–1900). Abraham employed many of the improvements to music printing that were introduced by the Leipzig engraver Gottlieb Röder, and launched the "Edition Peters" imprint in 1867. This series competed with Breitkopf & Härtel's similar Volksausgabe ("People's edition") series, launched at the same time. Two color schemes were used for the covers of this inexpensive series: a light green cover for works of earlier composers not affected by copyright restrictions; and pink covers for new, original works acquired by Peters or licensed from other publishers. By 1880, the year Abraham took over the directorship, Peters had begun issuing new works by contemporary composers of the era. By 1900, new works from composers including Brahms, Bruch, Grieg, Köhler, Moszkowski, Reger, Sinding and Wagner were included in the catalog.

Abraham's successor was his nephew, Henri Hinrichsen, who added works of Mahler, Pfitzner, Reger, Schoenberg, and Hugo Wolf. The works of Richard Strauss that were originally issued by Joseph Aibl (later Universal Edition) were acquired by Hinrichsen for Peters in 1932. Hinrichsen's sons Max (1901–1965), Walter (1907–1969), and Hans-Joachim (1909–1940) all entered the business in the 1930s.

Following the advent of the Nazi German government in Germany, Max Hinrichsen moved to London, where in 1938 he founded Hinrichsen Edition (renamed Edition Peters London in 1975), and his brother Walter moved to New York where he founded C. F. Peters Corp. (including the subsidiary Henmar Press) in 1948. By 1940, the Nazi regime forced Henri and Hans-Joachim Hinrichsen to turn over the company to Johannes Petschull (1901–2001), who later established the Frankfurt company in 1950 in partnership with the Hinrichsen heirs Walter and Max Hinrichsen.

In spite of suffering a similar degree of damage as other Leipzig publishers from the Allied bombing of Germany during the war, the Leipzig facility was re-opened in 1947, and transferred to state ownership of the East German government by 1949. Its first director was Georg Hillner, who was succeeded by musicologist Bernd Pachnicke in 1969. During the communist era, Peters Leipzig issued contemporary works of composers including Paul Dessau and Hanns Eisler, along with those of Soviet composers including Khachaturian and Shostakovich in addition to a number of urtext editions of works by Beethoven, Chopin, Fauré, Mahler, Scriabin, Vivaldi and others. Since the late 1960s the publisher also developed an internationally performed new music line, with composers such as Friedrich Goldmann and Georg Katzer. Following German reunification in 1990, the Leipzig concern was absorbed by the Frankfurt firm, who had acquired the catalogues of M.P. Belaieff in 1971, Schwann in 1974 and C.F. Kahnt in 1989.

The Peters Edition Ltd. (London), the C.F. Peters Corporation (New York), the C.F. Peters Musikverlag (Frankfurt/Main) and the Leipzig firms of the Edition Peters merged in August 2010 to form Edition Peters Group. In July 2014, the headquarters was moved from Frankfurt back to Leipzig. In April 2023, the Wise Music Group acquired a controlling interest in Edition Peters Group. Shortly after, Faber Music announced an agreement between Wise Music Group and them for the printed music business, making Faber Music the worldwide representative of the entire sales catalogue of Edition Peters.
