= Christian Kluttig =

German conductor and pianist

Christian Kluttig (born 17 August 1943) is a German conductor, pianist and Hochschullehrer. From 1979 to 1990, he was chief conductor of the Orchester des Opernhauses Halle. Appointed general music director in 1983, he worked as such at the theatres in Halle (Saale) and Theater Koblenz. The Handel interpreter rendered special services to the implementation of Historically informed performance in the Saale city, which made him one of the most important protagonists in this field in the GDR. He also devoted himself to Neue Musik, premiering Reiner Bredemeyer's opera Candide.

== Life ==
Kluttig was born in Dresden as a son of the cantor and subsequent Kirchenmusikdirektor Gottfried Kluttig (1913–2004). Kluttig had accordingly grown up with the music of Johann Sebastian Bach. In his hometown, he attended the Kreuzschule. From 1961 to 1967, he studied conducting with general music director Rudolf Neuhaus and Horst Förster at the Hochschule für Musik Carl Maria von Weber Dresden. Furthermore, he took part in conducting courses given by Arvīds Jansons and Igor Markevitch in Weimar as well as Hans Swarowsky and Witold Rowicki in Vienna.

After he had also undergone piano training in Dresden with Ingeborg Finke-Siegmund, he received his first engagement as solo répétiteur with conducting duties at the Saxon State Opera in 1967. There, he was active as an opera conductor for the first time with Le postillon de Lonjumeau by Adolphe Adam, Der Freischütz by Carl Maria von Weber and Die Zauberflöte by Mozart. In 1969, he also conducted his first Handel opera with Deidamia. In Dresden, he learned a lot from guest conductors such as Rudolf Kempe and Igor Markevitch during orchestral work.

With his Dresden qualifications, he moved in 1969 to Karl-Marx-Stadt (now Chemnitz), where he became First Kapellmeister at the city Theater in 1969. In this capacity he studied among others the operas Simon Boccanegra by Verdi and The Queen of Spades by Tchaikovsky. At the Opera House, he conducted the premiere of the Carl Riha production of Wagner's Die Meistersinger von Nürnberg with Kammersänger Konrad Rupf as Hans Sachs in 1974. In a later interview (1985), he stated that his Wagner work so far had proved to be "a great happiness" for him. At the same time, he regretted that he had hardly found the opportunity to interpret him. In 1975, he rose to the position of musical director. In 1979, he opened the Robert Schumann Days in the Stadthalle Chemnitz with Schumann's oratorio Paradise and the Peri. In addition, he devoted himself in Chemnitz to the symphonic work of Dmitri Shostakovich and Gustav Mahler.

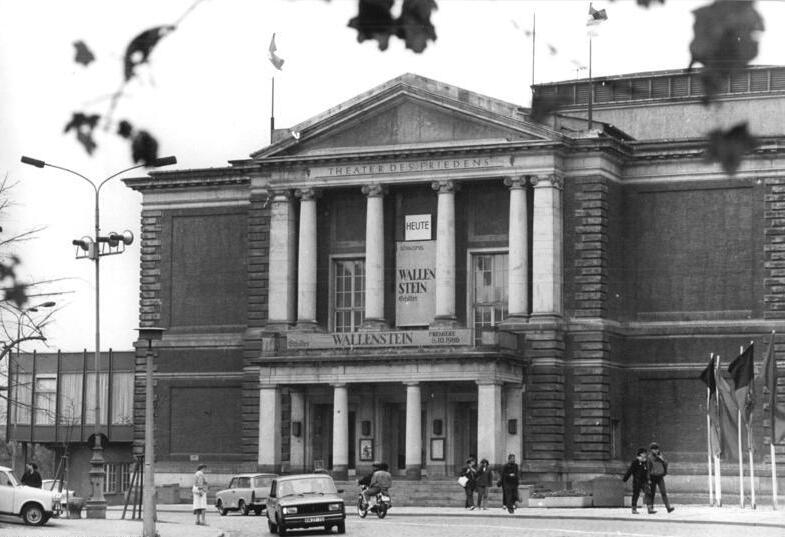
Theater des Friedens, Landestheater Halle (1986)

Finally, in 1979, artistic director Ulf Keyn brought him to the Landestheater Halle as musical director. The new management team continued to include Martin Schneider (opera director), Karin Zauft (chief dramaturge), Peter Sodann (drama director) and Dieter Wardetzki (1st play director of the Sprechtheater). He also became chief conductor of the Orchestra of the Halle Opera House and took over all George Frideric Handel productions in Halle from 1979 to 1990. Thus he directed Ezio (1979), Agrippina (1980), Poro (1981), Alessandro (1983), Floridante (1984), Il pastor fido and Terpsichore (1985), Partenope (1985), Rinaldo (1987), Oreste (1988) and Tamerlano (1990). With 41 performances, the opera Rinaldo was the second most performed Handel production in Halle. Kluttig received support regarding performance practice from the musicologist Bernd Baselt. Kluttig had to cope with "an immense workload and encrusted structures" in connection with the Georg-Friedrich-Händel-Gesellschaft, according to opera director Andreas Baumann. In addition to Baumann, from 1981, he worked closely in Halle with Peter Konwitschny, from 1986. Thus Kluttig played his part in opening up the festival to theatre directors. Kluttig helped several singers socialised in Leipzig to get engagements in the Saale city, mainly on the recommendation of the singing teacher Helga Forner. Among the new recruits were Annette Markert, Juliane Claus, Hendrikje Wangemann, Jürgen Trekel and Tomas Möwes. He repeatedly invited Simone Kermes as a guest. The first "in-house" countertenor Axel Köhler received special support. According to Baumann, Kluttig stood for the "retention of Handel's dramaturgy" and had "new translations produced that were oriented towards the original text". In this way, Kluttig provided essential suggestions for a "New Handel Style Halle". Halle advanced to become an "East German centre of historical performance practice", as music journalist Michael Struck-Schloen put it. For musicologist Karin Zauft, Kluttig was one of the pioneers of historical performance practice in the GDR The opera ensemble made guest appearances both in the so-called Eastern Bloc (Czechoslovakia, Poland, Hungary) as well as in the Federal Republic of Germany, Austria and Switzerland. After performances in 1985 at the Prague Spring International Music Festival and at the Dresden Music Festivals, guest appearances took him to the Kissinger Sommer even before the fall of the Wall. (1989–1993, 1995, 2000/01) und zu den Innsbruck Festival of Early Music.

In Halle, according to Gilbert Stöck, he was also responsible for "two nationally acclaimed productions of contemporary and at the same time socialy critic operas": In 1984, Der Preis by Karl Ottomar Treibmann was staged and in 1986 Candide by Reiner Bredemeyer was premiered. On the occasion of the Hallische Musiktage, he repeatedly premiered works by foreign composers with the Handel Festival Orchestra, such as in 1980 Avet Terterian's Symphony No. 5 and 1985 Primož Ramovš's Dialogue for Piano and Orchestra (soloist: Bettina Otto). As Gilbert Stöck noted, Kluttig was also open to works by Gerd Domhardt. Thus in 1982 whose Symphony II was premiered. In 1990, he premiered Günter Neubert's orchestral music Das verschenkte Weinen. In 1990, at the Handel House, he was one of the co-founders of the Halle Music Council, as whose vice-chairman he served from then on. The declining attendance figures at the Landestheater Halle in the course of the Peaceful Revolution probably ultimately led to the resignation of the Kluttig and Baumann team.

After a guest appearance, he was from 1991 to 1998 in succession to James Lockhart Chief Conductor of the Staatsorchester Rheinische Philharmonie and, as it were, musical director of the Theater Koblenz. There, he cultivated both the operatic and the concert repertoire Thus, on the one hand, he conducted the Handel operas Giulio Cesare (1989), Serse (1993), Alcina (1997) and Tamerlano (1999), on the other hand, he performed all Mahler symphonies. On the occasion of the 2000th anniversary of the city, he performed Mahler's Symphony No. 8 a festive concert in the Sporthalle Oberwerth. With the orchestra, he was responsible for the world premiere of Róbert Wittinger's Sinfonia no. 5. During Kluttig's tenure, the orchestra received the "Best Concert Programme of the 1995/96 Season" award from the Deutscher Musikverleger-Verband.

Kluttig once named Claudio Abbado as his artistic role model. For the music critic Wolf-Eberhard von Lewinski, he is "a sovereignly controlling and unpretentiously shaping conductor". The musicologist Peter Gülke attested to Kluttig's combination of "modesty [...] with the authority of the highly competent". He had "completed a huge opera repertoire" and was well known in the Historically informed performance (Baroque) as well as in "the classics and in Mahler scores." Thus Kluttig's repertoire includes, in particular, orchestral works and oratorios by George Frideric Handel, as well as works by Wolfgang Amadeus Mozart and Gustav Mahler. He also championed Neue Musik, for example, he brought the 1972 Piano Concerto by Manfred Weiss, a work commissioned by the Staatskapelle Dresden (soloist: Gerhard Berge), and in 1983 at the New Gewandhaus together with the Leipzig Radio Symphony Orchestra Christfried Schmidt's "Munch music" premiered. Guest conducting engagements took him to the Staatsoper Unter den Linden and Dresden as well as the Landestheater Linz (Serse, 1981) and the Theater Osnabrück (Alcina, 1997). He also worked among others with the Rundfunk-Sinfonieorchester Berlin, the Dresdner Philharmonie and the Berliner Symphoniker as well as the Saint Petersburg Philharmonic Orchestra. He presented several radio and record productions.

In 1984 Rector Gustav Schmahl brought him to teach conducting at the University of Music and Theatre Leipzig. He additionally took over the university symphony orchestra (HSO) there at the end of the 1980s and led it in a teaching capacity in a first phase until he left for Koblenz in 1991. Having already followed a call to Dresden as professor of orchestral conducting in 1998, he was additionally offered a professorship in Leipzig in 2000. He also became the full-time director of the Leipzig HSO this time. His tenure included the opening of the Great Hall and the engagement of renowned guest conductors such as Fabio Luisi, Kurt Masur and Herbert Blomstedt. After an interim period with his former assistant Michael Köhler in 2003/04, he took over the conducting post again until his emeritus in 2007. He also conducted several courses of the Dirigentenforum at the Deutscher Musikrat (Koblenz 1993, 1996 and 1998, Hilchenbach 2001, Recklinghausen 2011). Until 2015 he was still a lecturer for conducting in Dresden. His students include among others Titus Engel, Stefan Sanderling and Ines Schreiner.

But then Kluttig suffered an irreversible hearing disorder, which forced him to end his conducting career in 2002. He has since been increasingly involved as a chamber music pianist and Liedbegleiter. Kluttig is a founding member of the alumni association and board member of the Friends Society of the Dresden Academy of Music. He is married and father of three sons, whose eldest Roland Kluttig (born 1968) is also a conductor.

== Awards ==
- 1969: Support Prize at the Dresden Carl Maria von Weber Competition.
- 1971: Mendelssohn Scholarship 1971/72.
- 1981: Handel Prize.
- 1983:Conferment of the title Generalmusikdirektor.
- 1998: Honorary Member of the Richard Wagner Association Koblenz.

== Recordings ==
- Georg Friedrich Händel: Ode for St. Cecilia's Day (ETERNA, 1982 / Berlin Classics 1997) – Monika Frimmer, Eberhard Büchner, Chamber choir with members of the Halle State Theatre Choir, the Halle Choral Soloists and the Collegium vocale, Handel Festival Orchestra Halle
- Gerd Domhardt: 2. Sinfonie (NOVA, 1988) – Rundfunk-Sinfonie-Orchester Leipzig
- Christfried Schmidt: Munch-Musik (WERGO, 1994) – Rundfunksinfonieorchester Leipzig
- Engelbert Humperdinck: Die Heirat wider Willen (Deutsche Schallplatten, 1996) – Nils Giesecke, Simone Kermes, Peter Edelmann, Lena Lootens, Staatsorchester Rheinische Philharmonie
- Róbert Wittinger: Sinfonia no. 5 (ANTES EDITION, 1998) – Staatsorchester Rheinische Philharmonie
- Louis Spohr: Konzertante Werke (Deutsche Schallplatten, 2003) – Staatsorchester Rheinische Philharmonie among others.
