= Sinfonietta Dresden =

German chamber orchester

The Sinfonietta Dresden is a chamber orchestra from Dresden founded in 1994.

== History ==
The sinfonietta Dresden emerged in 1994 from the Young Dresden Chamber Orchestra.

The versatile ensemble performs works of choral symphonic and instrumental music from Baroque music to Neue Musik. A large number of world premieres of works by contemporary composers such as Herman Berlinski, Matthias Drude, Ludger Vollmer, Karsten Gundermann, Dietrich Lohff, Uwe Krause and Albrecht Menzel bear witness to the chamber orchestra's commitment to Neue Musik.

The Sinfonietta Dresden frequently performs together with other ensembles, for example with the Singakademie Dresden, the Dresdner Bachchor and the Dresdner Kreuzchor. The Sinfonietta Dresden also works with numerous other ensembles, such as the Kammerchor der Frauenkirche Dresden, Meißner Kantorei 1961 and the Dresdner Kapellknaben.

The Sinfonietta has also performed at important festivals. They performed at the Koblenz Mendelssohn Tage, the Dresdner Tage der zeitgenössischen Musik and the Dresden Music Festivals. Productions with ZDF, MDR and the Bayerischer Rundfunk, as well as its own CD recordings, round off the chamber orchestra's work.

The Sinfonietta Dresden is a member of the KlangNetz Dresden.

== Premieres ==
=== Orchestral works ===
- 2002: San-Eun Lee – Concerto for piano
- 2002: Steven Rosenhaus – Concerto for violin
- 2002: Karsten Gundermann – Concerto for three violins
- 2004: Johannes Korndörfer – Horch!
- 2005: Lothar Voigtländer – Orchestermusik III
- 2005: Peter Helmut Lang – in the scream of the sea
- 2005: Friedemann Sammler – Intermezzo für Kammerorchester
- 2005: Jorge García del Valle Méndez – I dream you dreamed about me
- 2006: Thuon Burtevitz – Son tamdadam, Konzertreihe Spannungen
- 2006: Uwe Krause – ...Land in Sicht...
- 2007: Carsten Hennig – Die Angst des Flusses vor der Mündung
- 2007: Karoline Schulz – Im Überschwang des Raumes
- 2008: Lydia Weisgerber – Des Kleinen Zähmungskraft
- 2008: Bernhard Lang – Felder, Dresdner Fassung
- 2008: Silke Fraikin – Grazioso 222 Quod libet für Kammerorchester
- 2009: Karsten Gundermann – Quantenzeit
- 2009: Andreas Kersting – é nijal tout
- 2010: Alexander Morawitz – Arktisches Licht
- 2010: Christian FP Kram – Spiegelungen
- 2010: Annette Schlünz – Spuren
- 2011: Konrad Möhwald – Gestern bis morgen, Vier Tageszeiten für Orchester
- 2012: Franziska Henke – Guitar concerto
- 2014: Sebastian Elikowski-Winkler – (z wjacorka, z wjacorka) wjelika śma)
- 2014: Torsten Reitz – Jede Taube
- 2014: Christian Münch – Piano concert, fragment
- 2015: Alexander Morawitz – Auf der Schwelle
- 2015: Doina Rotaru – Fragile (Concerto for clarinet)
- 2015: Violeta Dinescu – Tabu-Suite für Orchester No.2
- 2016: Christian Schiel – 1. Sinfonie
- 2016: Tobias E. Schick – Schichtungen
- 2017: Nikolaus Brass – music by numbers III
- 2018: Carsten Hennig – Vorstieg
- 2019: Karoline Schulz – Wind
- 2020/21: Franz Martin Olbrisch – ...suggests that something may be

=== Choral symphonic works ===
- 1995: Herman Berlinski – Prager Kantate
- 1995: Ludger Vollmer – Veni creator spiritus
- 1995: Thomas Kupsch – Stabat Mater
- 1998: Dietrich Lohff – Requiem für einen polnischen Jungen
- 2004: Matthias Drude – Für Deine Ehre habe ich gekämpft, gelitten
- 2006: Manfred Weiss – Wo der Herr nicht das Haus baut
- 2006: Manfred Weiss – Confessio Saxonica
- 2007: Lothar Voigtländer – MenschenZeit
- 2008: Friedbert Wissmann – If there be nothing new
- 2010: Manfred Weiss – Te Deum
- 2011: Karoline Schulz – In einer dunklen Nacht
- 2012: Wilfried Krätzschmar – fragmentum
- 2013: Alexander Keuk – Ein Tropfen, ein Schluck in der Höhe
- 2014: Jörg Herchet – Cantata para la Fiesta de Nuestra Señora de Guadalupe
- 2014: Matthias Drude – Poetische Kommentare zu Bachs Weihnachtsoratorium 1–6
- 2015: Alexander Keuk – Statements
- 2016: Matthias Drude – Zusage
- 2016: Franz Kaern-Biederstedt – Rätselhaftes
- 2016: Jörg Herchet – Christmas Oratorio (world premiere of the complete work)
- 2017: Matthias Drude – Wir können mit dir unser Leben wagen
- 2017: Reiner Bredemeyer –Berichte
- 2017: Jörg Herchet – Nun freut euch, lieben Christen g'mein Kantate zur Reformation
- 2017: Matthias Drude – Poetischer Kommentar zu BWV 80
- 2017: Thomas Stöß – Missa Misericórdiae
