= Hans Stieber Prize =

German music prize

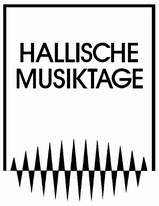

The Hans Stieber Prize is a promotional prize for composers of serious and light music, which is awarded by the fiduciary trust Hans Stieber Foundation of the Landesverband Sachsen-Anhalt Deutscher Komponistenverband based in Halle (Saale). The name giver and dedicatee is Hans Stieber (1886–1969), composer and founding director of the Staatliche Hochschule für Theater und Musik Halle.

It was donated after Stieber's death by his widow Gretl Stieber in 1977 from his inheritance and awarded annually until 1989 to mainly young composers of the GDR. After the Peaceful Revolution, Stieber's heirs asserted a replevin regarding the foundation's assets, which meant that the award had to be suspended for the time being.

A judgment of the Naumburg Higher Regional Court and a financial increase by the Saalesparkasse in Halle made the revival of the prize by the LVDK under the direction of Thomas Buchholz possible in 2000. The latter now offered the prize every two to four years as part of a competition for young composers as well as for musicologists publishing in the field of Neue Musik. It has since been awarded as part of the contemporary music festival Hallische Musiktage.

== Competition rules ==
The competition conditions were adapted in the course of the 2000s. Applicants up to the age of 23 or 25 with residence in the Federal Republic of Germany can take part. In order to deepen Germany's relationship with Eastern Europe and the CIS states, the residence criterion was then dropped for these participants.

An independent Jury selects the prize winners from anonymous scores. It is composed of the Board of Trustees of the Hans Stieber Foundation (chair: Willi Vogl, later Bernhard Schneyer), other appointed jurors and the advisory jury member Thomas Buchholz. The members are usually composers (among others Günter Neubert) and conductors.

The divisible prize money amounts to 1,000 euros (previously 2,000 D-Mark). Furthermore, prizes in kind will be awarded, including participation in a summer course of the Composers' Class Saxony-Anhalt. The award ceremony takes place within the framework of the Hallische Musiktage. For this purpose, a festive concert will be held at the Handel House in Halle.

The scores of the prize-winning works will be transferred to the archives of the Bibliothek der Stiftung Händel-Haus in Halle.

== Prize winners ==
=== 1977–1989 ===
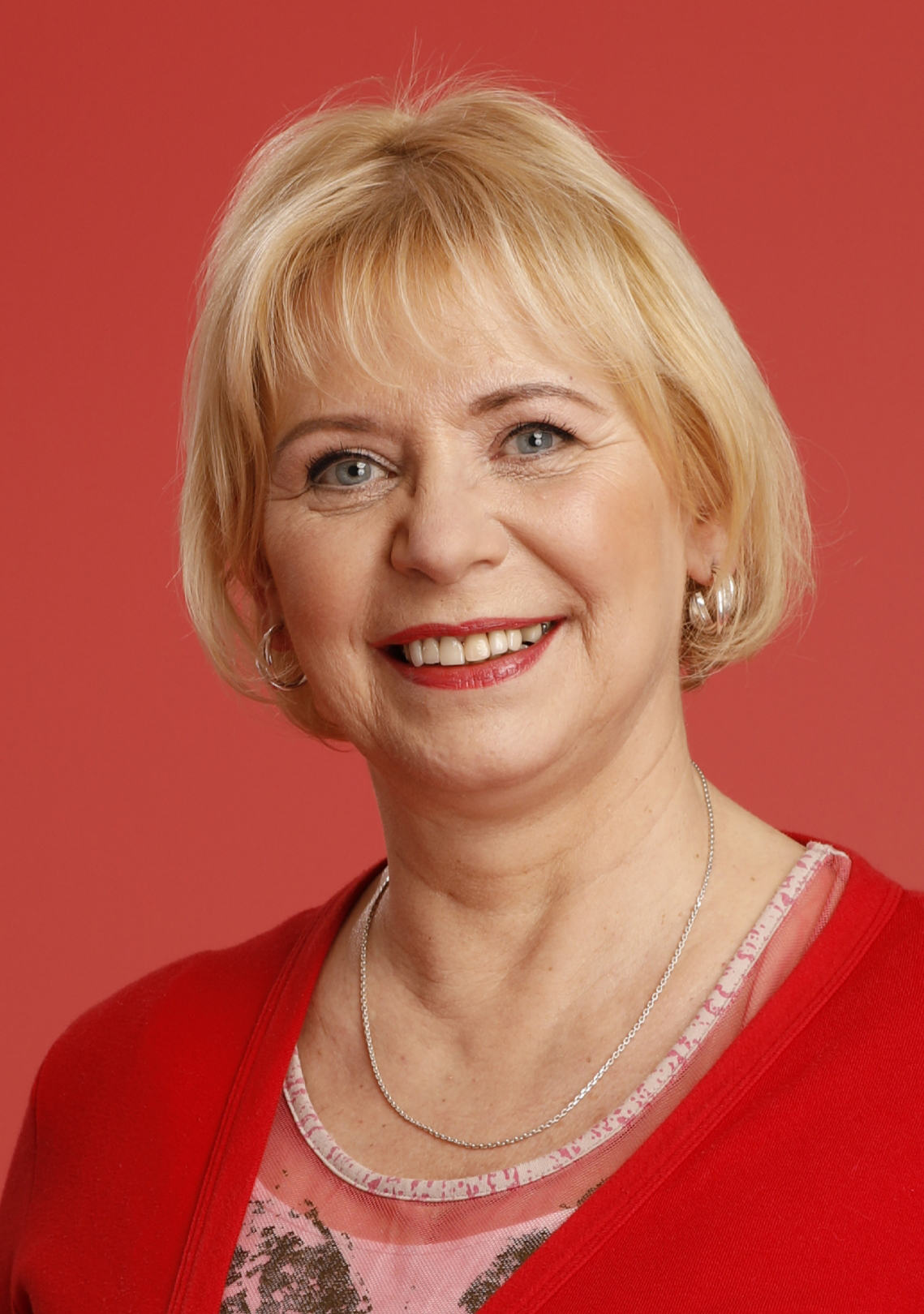
Ulrike Liedtke (1988 laureate)

Year	Laureate	Origin
1977	Manfred Weiss	Dresden
1978	Gerd Domhardt	Halle (Saale)
1979	Wilfried Krätzschmar	Dresden
1980	Reinhard Pfundt	Leipzig
1981	Johannes Wallmann	Berlin
1982	Thomas Hertel	Dresden
1983	Ralf Hoyer	Berlin
1984	Frank Petzold	Magdeburg
1985	Juro Mětšk	Bautzen
1986	Thomas Reuter	Halle (Saale)
1987	Bernd Franke	Leipzig
1988	Ulrike Liedtke	Berlin
1989	Helmut Zapf	Gera

=== Since 2000 ===
Year	Laureate	Origin	Winning piece(s)	Performer of the premiere
2000	Arno Lücker / Johannes Kreidler	Langenhagen; Dornhan/Leinstetten	Variationen über ein Thema von Sergej Prokofiew (aus Op. 39) for oboe, viola and bassoon / Baum und Landschaft. Music for viola and guitar	Ensemble Sortisatio, Leipzig
2002	Jakob Neubauer	Berlin	Stockungen for flute, violin, violoncello and piano	Ralf Mielke (flute), Hendrik Hochschild (violin, Hinnes Goudschaal (cello) and Dirk Fischbeck (piano)
2005 (Note: Katharina Schmauder received a recognition diploma for her work Zahnschmerzenblues.)	Tobias Klich	Weimar	Galgenliederbuch for voice, viola and piano	Member of the Sinfonietta Dresden
2009 (Note: Adrian Laugsch received an audience award for his work Mein Herz, mein Herz.)	Johann Friedrich Röpke	Magdeburg		Ensemble courage, Dresden
