= Johannes Korndörfer =

German choir director (born 1980)

Johannes Korndörfer (born in 1980) is a German music theorist, church musician and composer.

== Life ==
Korndörfer attended the Komponistenklasse Dresden, a school for young composers, studying with Silke Fraikin from 1991 to 1998. He then studied composition, music theory and piano at the Hochschule für Musik Carl Maria von Weber, Dresden, and further studied musicology there, graduating in 2006. Among his teachers were Jörg Herchet for composition, Clemens Kühn and John Leigh for music history, and Christine Haupt for piano. From 2006, Korndörfer has taught music theory at the Hochschule für Musik Carl Maria von Weber and its associated Sächsisches Landesgymnasium für Musik Carl Maria von Weber at the TU Dresden from 2010, and from 2011 at the Berlin University of the Arts. In 2009 he published a book about the composer Bernd Alois Zimmermann. He was a developer of the multimedia program to train hearing by the Dresden Zentrum für Musiktheorie (Centre for music theory).

Korndörfer became instructor of the Komponistenklasse in 1998. He was also appointed organist of the Schifferkirche Maria am Wasser in Dresden-Hosterwitz in 1999. Together with Matthias Herbig, he founded a choir and the ensemble Maria am Wasser.

His orchestral composition Horch! was premiered in 2004 by the Sinfonietta Dresden, conducted by Milko Kersten.

== Awards ==
The Komponistenklasse was awarded the 2015 Initiativpreis für Kunst und Kultur of Saxony for its engagement for the early training in music creation.

== Publications ==
Monographs

- Johannes Korndörfer: Zimmermanns Intercomunicazione: Regel und Freiheit beim Komponieren (in German) ISBN 978-3-639-15632-4.

Articles

- Johannes Korndörfer (2009). "Christoph Bernhards Figurenlehre im Werk von Heinrich Schütz". In Clemens Kühn; John Leigh (eds.). Systeme der Musiktheorie. Hochschule für Musik Carl Maria von Weber. Dresden: Sandstein Verlag. p. 85. ISBN 978-3-940319-64-7.
- Johannes Korndörfer (2010). "45 Minuten Zeitdehnung und Kugelgestalt. Vom Wert Neuer Musik im Unterricht". In Felix Diergarten; Ludwig Holtmeier; John Leigh; Edith Metzner (eds.). Musik und ihre Theorien. Clemens Kühn zum 65. Geburtstag. Dresden: Sandstein Verlag. p. 172. ISBN 978-3-942422-06-2. OCLC 688637242.
