= Hendrikje Wangemann =

German operatic soprano

- Born: 1961 (age 64–65); Kropstädt, Bezirk Halle, German Democratic Republic
- Genres: opera
- Occupation: soprano
- Website: hendrikjewangemann.de

Hendrikje Wangemann (born 1961) is a German operatic soprano.

== Life ==
Wangemann was born in 1961 in Kropstädt (now part of Wittenberg), in the Bezirk Halle of the German Democratic Republic (now in Saxony-Anhalt); her mother was a choir singer. Wangemann had private singing lessons with Lotte Taubenreuther, and then studied under Christa Noack and Eva Schubert at the Musikhochschule Leipzig.

While still a student she made her début at the Halle Opera House as Armida in the Rinaldo of Handel. From 1987 to 1991 she was a member of that opera, and sang rôles including Asteria in Tamerlano, Gilda in Rigoletto, Micaëla in Carmen, Marzelline in Fidelio, Nannetta in Falstaff and Susanna in The Marriage of Figaro

In 1991 she moved to the Leipzig Opera; among her rôles there were Despina in Così fan tutte, Musetta in La Bohème and Zerlina in Don Giovanni. In contemporary repertoire she has sung Amanda in Le Grand Macabre by György Ligeti, and a bread-seller in The Nose by Shostakovich; in 1997 she sang in the première of Abraum by Jörg Herchet. She has made guest appearances in Switzerland, Austria, Hungary and Poland, and has been active as a concert singer.
