= Klaus Zoephel =

German composer

Klaus Zoephel (16 July 1929 – 27 January 2017) was a German composer and conductor.

== Life ==
Born in Plauen, ready at a young age, during the Second World War, Zoephel worked as an organist in various places in his native Vogtland.

After the Abitur he studied conducting (with Egon Bölsche), musical composition from 1948 to 1953 (Johannes Weyrauch and Wilhelm Weismann and piano (Franz Langer) at the University of Music and Theatre Leipzig. Even before completing his studies in 1953 he was entrusted with the establishment and direction of the newly founded state cultural orchestra of the Senftenberg miners' district.

Afterwards he worked for several years as a theatre conductor (among others at the Deutsches Nationaltheater and Staatskapelle Weimar) and later as musical director of the State Cultural Orchestra Mühlhausen in Thuringia. From 1963 on, he worked for almost three decades as chief conductor of the State Orchestra Pirna of Dresden. (symphony orchestra). In 1970 he was appointed music director.

From 1965 to 1996 he simultaneously taught music theory, conducting and score playing at the Hochschule für Musik Carl Maria von Weber as a lecturer. Among his students were Hans-Joachim Rotzsch, Udo Zimmermann, Wilfried Krätzschmar, Romely Pfund, Hans-Peter Kirchberg, Johannes Winkler, Christian Kluttig, Volker Hahn and Jörg Herchet. Concert tours and radio recordings have taken him to numerous orchestras at home and abroad. He has also enjoyed international success as a composer of orchestral and chamber music works. He has received several prizes and awards for his compositional work.

Since 1995 he has lived as a freelance composer in Ingolstadt. He held various honorary posts and was president of the Joseph Haas Society since 1997. In an honorary capacity he looked after the senior citizens' choir at Münster Zur Schönen Unserer Lieben Frau in Ingolstad.

== Compositions ==
- Sinfonie in D (UA 1969)
- Sinfonietta (UA 1953, Rdfkprod. 1958, Rdfk-Kammerorch. Leipzig, Ltg. Dietrich Knothe)
- Verwandlungen eines Themas von Gottfried Heinrich Stölzel (UA 1964, Rdfkprod. 1969 Berlin Radio Symphony Orchestra, Ltg. d. Komponist)
- Musik für Orchester (UA 1982)
- Kleine Lustspielmusik (UA 1960, Rdfkprod. 1958 Gr. Rdfk-Orch. Leipzig, Ltg. Heinz Rögner)
- Musica ilare (UA 1977, Rdfkprod. Gr. Rdfk-Orch. Leipzig, Ltg. Klaus Wiese)
- Dohnasche Anekdoten, concert ouvertüre (UA 1990)
- Capriccio für Klavier und Orchester (UA 1959, Rdfkprod. 1965, sol. Renate Schorler, Ltg. Kurt Masur)
- Finckenschläge, Illustrationen zu Themen von H.F. (UA 1985, Rundfunkmitschnitt Sender Dresden 1989)
- Lâ trûren varn, mittelhochdeutsche Minnelieder für eine Sgst., viola (violine) and piano (UA 1949) bzw. for tenor and chamber orchestra (UA 1963)
- Spiel zu Dritt, trio for 2 violins and violoncello, (UA 1997)
- Von Vögeln gesungen, drei nichtige Begebenheiten nach Worten von Hermann Hesse für eine Singstimme und Klavier, UA 2008
- several vocal compositions (Lieder, Choralkantaten)

Some of Zoephel's works are published by renowned music publishers like Edition Peters.

Zoephel died in Ingolstadt at age 87.

== Editing ==
- Arrangement of the songs and ballads from Des Knaben Wunderhorn for voice and orchestra by Wilhelm Weismann
- Transcription of works by Johann Simon Mayr
- Publication of autographs of the composer Johannes Weyrauch

== Prizes and awards ==
- 1953 – 1. prize for the dance suite at the "Preisausschreiben zur Förderung einer neuen deutschen Unterhaltungsmusik"
- 1959 – Carl-Maria-von-Weber-Förderpreis (Dresden)
- 1970 – Titelverleihung Musikdirektor
- 1973 – Ehrennadel in Bronze des Verbandes der Komponisten und Musikwissenschaftler der DDR
- 1975 – Verdienstmedaille der DDR
- 1985 – Ehrennadel in Silber des Verbandes der Komponisten und Musikwissenschaftler der DDR
