= Shigeru Kan-no =

Japanese composer and conductor

Shigeru Kan-no (菅野 茂, Kan'no Shigeru) (born May 3, 1959) is a Japanese composer and conductor living in Germany.

== Biography ==
Shigeru Kan-no was born in Fukushima, Japan. He now lives as a free-lance composer and conductor in Westerwald, Germany. His repertoire includes over 100 operas and 700 concert pieces. He is also a talented performer, able to play piano, organ, violin, cello, percussion and lyre. As a pianist in the contemporary repertoire, he has played the music of Pierre Boulez, Karlheinz Stockhausen, Helmut Lachenmann, Giacinto Scelsi, Arvo Pärt, Luciano Berio, Sati, Karkoschka, Blume, etc.

He has won dozens of competitions in composition and conducting, and sixteen bursaries. His conducting experience includes various orchestras and chamber groups, choirs, ensembles for new music, Posaunenchöre (German brass band; literally "trombone choir"), operas and singing concerts, etc. A frequent advisor and teacher to other musicians, he has also served as a jurist for international competitions in composition and singing.

The music of Shigeru Kan-no is restrained, and at the same time, strong and colourful. He composes in every form of classical music and uses many musical techniques: tonal, atonal, chance, noise, pentatonic, hexatonic, serial, micro tone, free-form, electronic, minimal, no repetition, counterpoint, harmony, folk music, jazz, concrete, voluntary, etc. He favours long-form works for large orchestra, and his style shows the influence of Richard Wagner, Gustav Mahler, Arnold Schoenberg, Havergal Brian, Olivier Messiaen, John Cage, Karlheinz Stockhausen, LaMonte Young, etc.

He studied singing, piano and musical theory in Fukushima with Takeo Endo, Kazutsugu Saito, Chieko Saito and Kunio Suda. In Tokyo, he studied theory with Hideo Arashino, composition with Takehito Shimazu and Akira Nishimura, piano with Yuko Ozaki and Masako Hoshide, and conducting with Kikuo Matsumoto and Kazuhiko Sakamoto. In Vienna, he studied with Karl Österreicher and Leonard Bernstein. In Stuttgart, he studied composition with Helmut Lachenmann, electronic music with Erhard Karkoschka and orchestration with Milko Kelemen. He studied film music with Cong Su in Ludwigsburg, and in Frankfurt he took composition with Hans Zender and conducting with Hans-Dieter Loesch.

His technique and thinking about contemporary composition has influenced many young German composers: Carsten Hennig, Urlich Reuter, Charlotte Seither, etc. His compositional output is over 402 pieces.
