= Manfred Weiss (composer) =

German composer (1935–2023)

- Born: 12 February 1935; Niesky, German Reich
- Died: 25 April 2023 (aged 88); Dresden, Germany
- Occupations: Composer; academic teacher
- Organizations: Hochschule für Musik Carl Maria von Weber

Manfred Weiss (12 February 1935 – 25 April 2023) was a German composer especially of symphonies, concertos and vocal music, based in Dresden. He taught composition and music theory at the Hochschule für Musik Carl Maria von Weber from 1959, as professor from 1983 to 1997, influencing generations of composers, and instrumental in the restructuring of the music department after the German reunification.

== Life ==
Weiss was born in Niesky, Upper Lusatia. He grew up in a missionary family of the Herrnhut Brethren Community. He received violin lessons in Niesky and piano lessons in Görlitz in childhood. He also sang in the church choir and played the organ. At the age of twelve he composed his first pieces.

After his Abitur in 1952, Weiss studied at the Staatliche Hochschule für Theater und Musik Halle until 1955, composition with Hans Stieber and music theory with Franz von Glasenapp. Minor subjects were piano and viola. From 1955 to 1957 he studied at the Hochschule für Musik "Hanns Eisler" in East Berlin, composition with Rudolf Wagner-Régeny, and music theory with Ruth Zechlin (harmony) and Jürgen Wilbrandt (counterpoint) He graduated in 1957, but was not accepted for a position in Berlin due to critical remarks about the East German uprising of 1953. From 1957 to 1959 he studied further in Wagner-Régeny's master class at the Academy of Arts, Berlin.

In 1959, he was appointed a lecturer for composition at the Hochschule für Musik Carl Maria von Weber in Dresden. He was professor of composition and music theory there from 1983, and prorector from 1991 to 1997, being instrumental in the restructuring of the music department after the German reunification. He was emeritus from 1998. Weiss was a member of the Sächsischer Musikbund.

Weiss died in Dresden on 25 April 2023, at age 88.

== Work ==
Weiss composed more than 120 works, for orchestra, chamber and choral music as well as songs. His models include Béla Bartók, Paul Hindemith, György Ligeti, Witold Lutosławski, Arnold Schönberg and Igor Stravinsky. He was known for an upright attitude, defending his Christian ethics under the East German regime.

His works, including manuscripts and recordings, are held by the Saxon State and University Library Dresden. Many works were published by Breitkopf & Härtel. Main works include:

- Symphony No. 3 (1979/80)
- Symphony No. 4 (1986/87)
- Symphony No. 5 (1987)
- Concerto for Organ, Strings and Percussion (1975/76)
- Violin Concerto (1976/77)
- Cello Concerto (1986)
- Ahnung der Liebe, song cycle for baritone and orchestra (1976)
- Die Erlösten Gottes, cantata after the Book of Revelation for two mixed choirs, brass and percussion (1998)

His song cycle was first performed at the Stadttheater Cottbus in 1976, with soloist Günther Leib and conductor F. Morgenstern. His organ concerto was first played in 1977 by soloist Amadeus Webersinke and the Dresdner Staatskapelle conducted by Siegfried Kurz. In 1979 it was repeated, conducted by Herbert Kegel, leading to further performances and a recording. It was repeated further in 1987 on the occasion of the Leipzig Messe by the Leipzig Gewandhaus Orchestra conducted by Kurt Masur with Michael Schönheit as the organist.

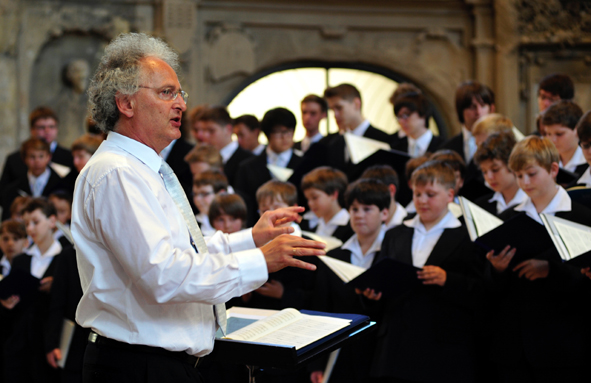
Dresdner Kreuzchor conducted by Roderich Kreile

His Third Symphony was premiered in 1984 by the Staatskapelle conducted by Herbert Blomstedt, and his Fourth in 1989 by the Dresdner Philharmonie conducted by Lothar Zagrosek as part of the Dresden Music Festival. In 1998, Die Erlösten Gottes was premiered by the Dresdner Kreuzchor conducted by Roderich Kreile, a gift to Kreile on the occasion of him assuming the post as Kreuzkantor. the soloist of his song cycle was baritone Günther Leib.

== Awards ==
- 1977: Martin-Andersen-Nexö-Kunstpreis by the city of Dresden
- 1977: Hanns Eisler Prize by Radio DDR
- 1977: Hans Stieber Prize by the Komponistenverband of Halle
- 1985: Art Prize of the German Democratic Republic

== Students ==
His students included:

- Ruth Bodenstein-Hoyme
- Michael Flade
- Reiko Füting
- Gottfried Glöckner
- Eckart Haupt
- Wolfgang Heisig
- Jörg Herchet
- Hans-Dieter Karras
- Ekkehard Klemm
- Robert Linke
- Rolf Thomas Lorenz
- Christian Münch

== Writings ==
- Jeder hatte sein eigenes Programm. Die Komponistenklassen der Hochschule für Musik "Carl Maria von Weber" Dresden und ihre Absolventen 1966–1999. In Matthias Herrmann (ed.): Dresden und die avancierte Musik im 20. Jahrhundert. OCLC 43262696, report of a colloquium by Dresdner Zentrum für Zeitgenössische Musik and the institute for musicology of the Hochschule für Musik Dresden, part 3: 1966–1999, vom 9. bis 11. Oktober 2000 in Dresden. Laaber, 2004, ISBN 3-89007-511-8, pp. 125–140.
