= Arno Lücker =

German composer and musicologist

- Born: 14 April 1979 (age 47); Braunschweig, Lower Saxony, Germany
- Education: University of Freiburg; Free University of Berlin
- Occupations: Composer; Musicologist; Music critic; Music dramaturge
- Organizations: Berliner Zeitung; Neue Musikzeitung; Konzerthaus Berlin; University of Marburg; Opernwelt
- Awards: Hans Stieber Prize
- Website: www.arnoluecker.de

Arno Lücker (born 14 April 1979) is a German composer, musicologist, music critic and music dramaturge. He worked as a journalist in Berlin for press and radio, and as dramaturge at the Konzerthaus Berlin where he installed the series 2 x hören, presenting the same music twice. He has been lecturer of musicology at the University of Marburg, and journalist for Opernwelt, the leading trade journal for opera.

== Life ==
Born in Braunschweig, Lücker grew up in Langenhagen near Hanover. As a boy, he received piano lessons. He studied musicology and philosophy in Hanover, Freiburg and Berlin from 1999. He completed studies of musicology at the Free University of Berlin with a work about Gustav Mahler's Lieder.

In 2000, he earned the Hans Stieber Prize, a composition prize of the Hallische Musiktage, for Variations on a Theme by Sergei Prokofiev, premiered by Ensemble Sortisatio. He has published in various musicological journals, and has been active as a music critic, among others for the Berliner Zeitung and the Neue Musikzeitung. His works have been produced by various radio stations, such as Bayerischer Rundfunk, Deutschlandfunk and Deutschlandradio.

Lücker lives and works as a composer, musicologist and freelance journalist for rbb Kultur in Berlin. Since 2008, he has worked as the managing director of the Berliner Gesellschaft für Neue Musik. From 2010, he was dramaturge for contemporary music at the Konzerthaus Berlin. He installed a concert series, 2 x hören (listen twice), focused each time on one piece of music, which was first performed without any introduction or program notes, followed by interviews with performers and sometimes the composer, and finally presenting the music a second time. The series alternated between 2 x hören klassisch, with Lücker as the moderator, and 2 x hören zeitgenössisch with contemporary music, moderated by Christian Jost. In 2018, Lücker's career at the Konzerthaus Berlin was ended after a controversy surrounding a parody shred video. The violinist Daniel Hope, dubbed in it with lewd remarks, had threatened legal action. Lücker then deleted the video from his YouTube channel, and reconciled with Hope.

In 2021, Lücker developed a website to find women composers. He has been lecturer of musicology at the University of Marburg, and journalist for Opernwelt, the leading trade journal for opera.

== Awards ==
- 2000: Hans Stieber Prize

== Publications ==
- Reinhard Keisers Orpheus-Opern – Anmerkungen zu den Libretti. In Frankfurter Zeitschrift für Musikwissenschaft. 7 (2004) 9, pp. 69–92.
- „Mahlers Gefahr ist die des Rettenden“. Trost bei Adorno und das „Lied von den schönen Trompeten“. In Musik & Ästhetik. 11 (2007) 43, pp. 68–79.
- So normal wie ein Audioguide im Museum. Ein Gespräch über Vermittlungsmotivationen. In positionen. 92 (2012), pp. 21–23.
- Arno Lücker: op. 111 / Ludwig van Beethovens letzte Klaviersonate Takt für Takt (in German) Wolke-Verlag 2020
