= Rainer Kunad =

German conductor and composer

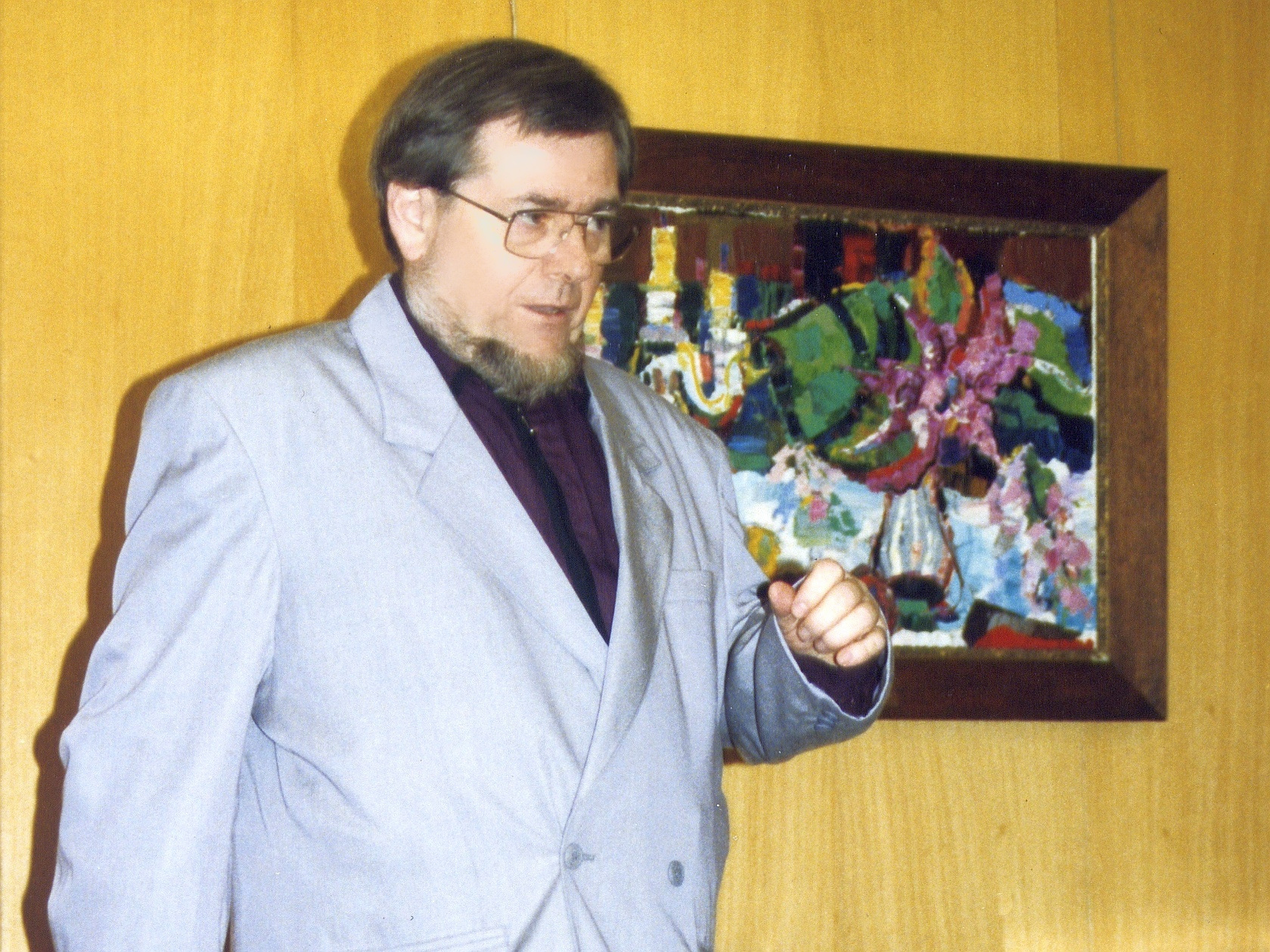
- Rainer Kunad 1992 in Dresden
- Born: 24 October 1936; Chemnitz, Germany
- Died: 17 July 1995 (aged 58); Reutlingen, Germany
- Education: Musikhochschule Leipzig
- Occupations: Conductor; Composer
- Organizations: Staatsschauspiel Dresden; Staatsoper Berlin
- Awards: Art Prize of the German Democratic Republic; Hanns-Eisler-Preis; National Prize of the German Democratic Republic

Rainer Kunad (24 October 1936, Chemnitz – 17 July 1995, Reutlingen) was a German conductor and composer, especially of opera.

== Life ==
Kunad studied choir and ensemble conducting at the Dresden Conservatoire from 1955 to 1956 and then, until 1959, composition with Fidelio F. Finke and Ottmar Gerster at the Musikhochschule in Leipzig. From 1960 to 1974, he directed theatrical music at the Staatsschauspiel Dresden, and 1971 onward, he also worked at the Berlin State Opera. Kunad was a regular member of the Academy of the Arts of the GDR since 1974. In 1972, he received the Art Prize of the German Democratic Republic, the Hanns-Eisler-Preis in 1973, and the National Prize of the German Democratic Republic in 1975.

In 1985, he applied to the authorities for a dismissal from GDR citizenship, which was granted. He lived in West Germany from 1984 onward. He spent the last years of his life as a freelance artist in Tübingen.

Kunad composed piano pieces, chamber and orchestral music and operas (among others, Bill Brook, according to a story by Wolfgang Borchert and Der Meister und Margarita after the novel by Mikhail Bulgakov).

== Works ==
Operas

- Bill Brook (1959/60), premiered Dresden 1965
- Das Schloss (1961/62)
- Old Fritz (1962/63, premiered Dresden 1965
- Maître Pathelin oder Die Hammelkomödie (1968), premiered Dresden 1969
- Sabellicus (1972/73, premiered Berlin 1974
- Litauische Claviere (1974, premiered Dresden 1976
- Der Eiertanz, premiered Bautzen 1975
- Vincent (1975/76), premiered Dresden 1979
- Amphitryon, premiered Berlin 1984)
- Der Meister und Margarita (1982/83), premiered 1986
- Der Traum (1993), premiered Hagen 2000

Ballets

- Ich: Orpheus (1964/65)
- Wir aber nennen Liebe lebendigen Frieden (1970), premiered Dresden 1972
- Münchhausen (1977/78), premiered Weimar and Kassel 1981

Symphonies

- Sinfonie 64 (1964)
- Sinfonie II (1966/67)
- Sinfonietta (1969), premiered Schwerin

Concertos

- Piano Concerto (1969), premiered Dresden 1971
- Concerto for Harpsichord, Pianom Jonika, Celesta and Orchestra (1970)
- Concerto for Organ, two string orchestras and timpani (1971), premiered Dresden 1971

Orchestral

- Sinfonia variatione (1959)
- Pathelin-Portrait (1974)
- Divertimento (1968)
- Antiphonie (1971), premiered Frankfurt/Oder
- Quadrophonie (1973)
- Szène concertante (1975), premiered Dresden 1976

Chamber music:

- Aphorismen (1956/57)
- String Quartet No. 1 (1957)
- Konzertantes Klaviertrio (1958)
- Notturno for cello solo (1958)
- Grande Ouverture for two pianos
- Musik für Bläser (1965)
- Concerto per Archi (1966)
- String Quartet No. 2 (1967)
- Commedia 'Die Ehe' (1969)
- Pneumatika for akkordion (1971)
- Duomix (1973)
- Miniaturen for organ and percussion (1977/78)
- Mozartparaphrase
- Phantysy for organ
- Rimstinger Adventsmusik
- Sonatine for piano (1992)

Vocal music

- Schattenland Ströme, Gesänge nach Gedichten von Johannes Bobrowski (1966)
- Melodie, die ich verloren hatte, Gesänge nach Versen von Günter Deicke (1968)
- Von der Kocherie, Ein kulinarisches Loblied (1970)
- Pro novo, after Dante Alighieri (1973)
- Metai, nach Texten von Kristijonas Donelaitis (Das Jahr, Die Jahreszeiten)
- Klopstock-Ode, premiered Dresden
- Bobrowski-Motette, premiered Berlin 1981
- Honig holen
- Dona nobis, premiered Dresden 1992
- Mit dem Hauch seines Mundes, Christus und der Antichrist (1988/89)

Oratorios

- Das Spiel vom Heliand (1957)
- Pax mundi (1966)
- Die Kitschpostille (1974)
- Stimmen der Völker, premiered Dresden 1983

Sacred oratorios

- Salomonische Stimmen (1982), premiered Dresden 1984
- Das Thomas-Evangelium (1984/85), premiered Kiel 1987
- Trilogie der Offenbarung Gottes:
  - Part I: Jovian, der Seher (1985), premiered Mannheim 1987
  - Part II: Der Seher von Patmos (1985/86), premiered Karlsruhe 1988
  - Part III: Das neue Jerusalem (1986), premiered Sindelfingen 1989
- Die Pforte der Freude (1987), premiered Stuttgart and Tübingen 1990

Mystery plays

- Die Menschen von Babel (1983/84), premiered Munich 1986
- Kosmischer Advent, Spiel von der Wiederkunft des Herrn (1987), premiered Ulm and Munich 1991

Sacred symphonies

- Symphony No. 3 "Sinfonie des göttlichen Friedens" (1986/87), premiered Darmstadt 1989
- Symphony No. 9 "Die sieben Siegel" (1993), premiered Reutlingen 1993
- Symphony No. 12 "Der Berg Zion" (1994), premiered in Dresden 1996

== Literature ==
- Siglind Bruhn: (online) (Jesus and Satan in Moscow. Three Late-20th-century Operas on Bulgakov's Novel. In The Journal of Music and Meaning 4 (Winter 2007)
- Sabine Kreter: "Alles auf Hoffnung" - Bobrowski-Vertonungen von Rainer Kunad, Dissertation 1993. Waxmann, Münster/ New York 1994, ISBN 3-89325-207-X.
- Thomas Kupsch: Neue Musik am Staatsschauspiel Dresden. Die Komponisten Rainer Kunad, Thomas Hertel and Eckehard Mayer als Leiter der Schauspielmusik im letzten Drittel des 20. Jahrhunderts. In: Herrmann, Matthias (ed.): Dresden und die avancierte Musik im 20. Jahrhundert. Laaber 2004, ISBN 3-89007-511-8, pp. 201–210.
- Rolf Stabel: IM Tänzer. Der Tanz und die Staatssicherheit. Schott, Mainz 2008, ISBN 978-3-7957-0165-9. (zu R. Kunad, pp. 30–57: Wir aber nennen Liebe lebendigen Frieden. Eine (eigentlich zu kurze) Tanzgeschichte der DDR).
- Heike Sauer: Traum, Wirklichkeit, Utopie: das deutsche Musiktheater 1961–1971 als Spiegel politischer und gesellschaftlicher Aspekte seiner Zeit, Dissertation 1993. Waxmann, Münster / New York 1994, ISBN 3-89325-235-5.
