= Juro Mětšk =

Sorbs composer (1954–2022)

- Born: 1 May 1954; Bautzen, East Germany
- Died: 20 January 2022 (aged 67); Herrnhut, Saxony, Germany
- Occupation: Composer

Juro Mětšk (1 May 1954 – 20 January 2022) was a Sorbian composer.

== Life and career ==
Born in Bautzen, the son of the Sorbian writer and publicist Frido Mětšk, he studied at the Hochschule für Musik Hanns Eisler Berlin until 1976, and was a teacher at a music school from 1976 to 1980. From 1980 to 1983, he completed master studies at the Academy of Arts, Berlin with Reiner Bredemeyer. In 1985, he received the Hans Stieber Prize as part of the Hallische Musiktage. From 1983 to 1986, he worked as a music dramaturge at the Deutsch-Sorbisches Volkstheater in Bautzen and has lived there as a freelance composer since 1986.

His work Syndrom was awarded a prize at the 1989 competition Forum junger Komponisten of the Westdeutscher Rundfunk.

Mětšk died in Herrnhut on 20 January 2022, at the age of 67.

== Works ==
- accents antiques for string quartet, 1975
- musica da camera, 1978/79
- Psychogramme for Orchestra
- SESTETTO
- Canti per Violoncello e Piano
- trio…torso…alla…rondo…alla…torso…
- mit groteskem riesenbogen … trüb ein pizzicato for viola solo, 1984
- KONTRAKTION“ Kontra-aktionen für kammerensemble, 1988.
- syndrom for chamber ensemble
- Retour pour grande orchestra
