= Michael Flade =

German composer

Michael Flade (born in 1975) is a German composer.

== Life ==
Born in Dessau, Flade was a pupil of Hans Jürgen Wenzel in the Composer class Halle. From 1993 he studied musical composition with Jörg Herchet, music theory with Manfred Weiss as well as piano and conducting at the Hochschule für Musik Carl Maria von Weber in Dresden. With a DAAD scholarship he was in a master program at the Manhattan School of Music in New York, where he was taught by Nils Vigeland. From 1998 to 2001 he was a postgraduate student with Wilfried Krätzschmar in Dresden. He also studied musicology at the Martin Luther University of Halle-Wittenberg.

Since 2001 he has taught composition, acoustics, organology, instrumentation, ear training and Max/MSP in Dresden. From 2006 to 2008 he represented the professorship for electronic music in Dresden and was acting director of the Studio für Elektronische Musik (Dresden). From 2008 to 2010 he was lecturer for music theory at the Technische Universität Dresden. Since 2010 he is lecturer for ear training at the State University of Music and Performing Arts Stuttgart.

Flade works and lives as a composer in Stuttgart. Many of his works use live electronic music. Among other things he composed In Verbindung (2005, world premiere by Matthias Lorenz), wechselnd, verwoben, zuzeiten gelassen I (2002, premiered by the Ensemble Sortisatio), unverbunden strömt verbindlich (2001, premiere Reiko Füting) and Eigenart blüht auf (2000, premiered by the Ensemble Konfrontation).

== Awards ==
- Scholarship of the Deutscher Akademischer Austauschdienst (1999)
- Förderpreis des Sächsischen Musikbundes (2001)
- Scholarship of the Künstlerhaus Lukas (2007)

== Publications ==
- Klang und Bewegung in Wilfried Krätzschmars Komposition "turns" (Drehungen) für sechs Schlagzeuger. In Jörn Peter Hiekel (ed.): W. Krätzschmar. Perspektiven seines Schaffens. Sandstein, Dresden 2005, ISBN 3-937602-55-0, pp. 60–70.
