= Frank Petzold =

German composer, conductor and jazz pianist

- Born: 18 May 1951; Zwickau, East Germany
- Education: Hochschule für Musik Carl Maria von Weber Dresden; Academy of Arts, Berlin
- Occupations: Composer; Conductor; Jazz pianist
- Organisations: Staatstheater Cottbus; Brandenburgische Technische Universität
- Awards: Hans Stieber Prize

Frank Petzold (born 1951) is a German composer, conductor and jazz pianist. A composer of operas and other stage works, he has worked at theatres, from 1994 as Kapellmeister at the Staatstheater Cottbus. He has lectured music theory and jazz piano at the Brandenburgische Technische Universität in Cottbus from 2001.

== Life ==
Petzold was born in Zwickau in 1951. He took piano lessons from age nine. He studied composition, conducting and piano at the Hochschule für Musik Carl Maria von Weber Dresden from 1968 to 1974, composition with Siegfried Köhler. From 1974 to 1977, he worked as Kapellmeister and choir director at the Theater der Altmark in Stendal. He also worked as Kapellmeister for plays at the Theater Magdeburg from 1977 to 1979.

From 1977 to 1981 he studied composition with Rainer Kunad at the Academy of Arts, Berlin. He was a freelance composer and pianist in Magdeburg and Cottbus from 1981 to 1994, writing operas, orchestral music, chamber music, stage works and jazz music. Since 1990 he has been regional chairman of the German Composers' Association in Cottbus. In 1994, he became Kapellmeister at the Staatstheater Cottbus, and held the position to 2001, when he became also lecturer for music theory and jazz piano at the Brandenburgische Technische Universität in Cottbus from 2011.

Petzold is married; the couple has two sons.

== Prize ==
- Hans Stieber Prize for composition (1984)

== Works ==
=== Stage works ===
- 1980/81: Das Kälberbrüten, Fastnachtsspiel (Carnival play) after Hans Sachs for soprano, tenor, bass and six instruments. premiere: 1982.
- 1986/87: Prinzessin Zartfuß und die sieben Elefanten, comic opera in one act based on the play of the same name by Albert Wendt, libretto by the composer, premiere: Theater der Stadt Cottbus, 1989.

=== Other compositions ===
- 1990: Sinfonie in F, premiered by the Dresden Philharmonic

== Recordings ==
- Tritonia (2000)
- Jazzterday Live (2005)
