= Theodor Schubach =

German composer

Theodor Schubach (born in 1985) is a German composer.

== Life ==
Born in Berlin, from 1997 to 2004 Schubach attended the Sächsisches Landesgymnasium für Musik Carl Maria von Weber. During his school years he received piano lessons from Gunnar Nauck and Marlies Jacob and musical improvisation with Anja Damianow and Ute Pruggmayer-Philipp.

After the Abitur, Schubach studied conducting with Ekkehard Klemm, followed composition lessons with Wilfried Krätzschmar and Jörg Herchet and electroacoustic music (at the Studio für Elektronische Musik (Dresden) with Franz Martin Olbrisch and Michael Flade at the Hochschule für Musik Carl Maria von Weber as well as composition with Clemens Gadenstätter and Mark Andre at the Universität für Musik und darstellende Kunst Graz. Additionally he took part in master classes with Brian Ferneyhough, Bernhard Lang, Enno Poppe and Rebecca Saunders among others in Tel Aviv, Warsaw and Graz. Since 2011 he is enrolled in the master's program in composition and computer music with Marco Stroppa and Piet Johan Meyer at the State University of Music and Performing Arts Stuttgart.

His works have been interpreted by the singers Lisa Fornhammar and Anna Palimina and the pianist Ian Pace, among others. Furthermore, the ensemble courage, the Ensemble Sortisatio, the Dresden Philharmonic (KlangNetz Dresden) and the Loh-Orchester Sondershausen perform his pieces. His compositions have been heard at the Festival Next Generation of the ZKM Center for Art and Media Karlsruhe, at the Resonanzen-Festival für Hörkunst in Leipzig, at the Darmstädter Ferienkurse and at the Experimentalstudio-Akademie/matrix 10 in Freiburg.

== Compositions ==
- Für vier Lautsprecher und ein Mikrophon (2007)
- Grundriss (2008)
- Resonanzen II (2009)
- Resonanzen – Aurora für Orchester und Stimme (2010)
- neues Stück für zwei Klaviere und Live-Elektronik (2011)
- Grundriss für Violoncello solo (2011)
- kerben/Traumprotokolle/Resonanzen für Orchester und Violoncello (2012)
- schreiben/sanden für Klavier (2012)

== Awards ==
- Third prize at the National Bach Competition for young pianists in Köthen (1999).
- First prize at the Saxon State Competition for (2002)
- Prize at the national competition Jugend musiziert in Weimar (2003).
- Scholarship of the Federal Ministry of Education and Research (Germany) and the Sparda-Bank Baden-Württemberg (Deutschlandstipendium) (2012).
- Composition scholarship of the Landesmusikakademie Sondershausen (2012)
- Karl-Steinbuch-Stipendium of the Medien- und Filmgesellschaft Baden-Württemberg (2012)
- Second prize in the composition competition of the London Ear Festival (2013)
- Casa Baldi, scholarship of the Villa Massimo in Rome (2016)
