= Bernhard Schneyer =

German composer, conductor and music educator

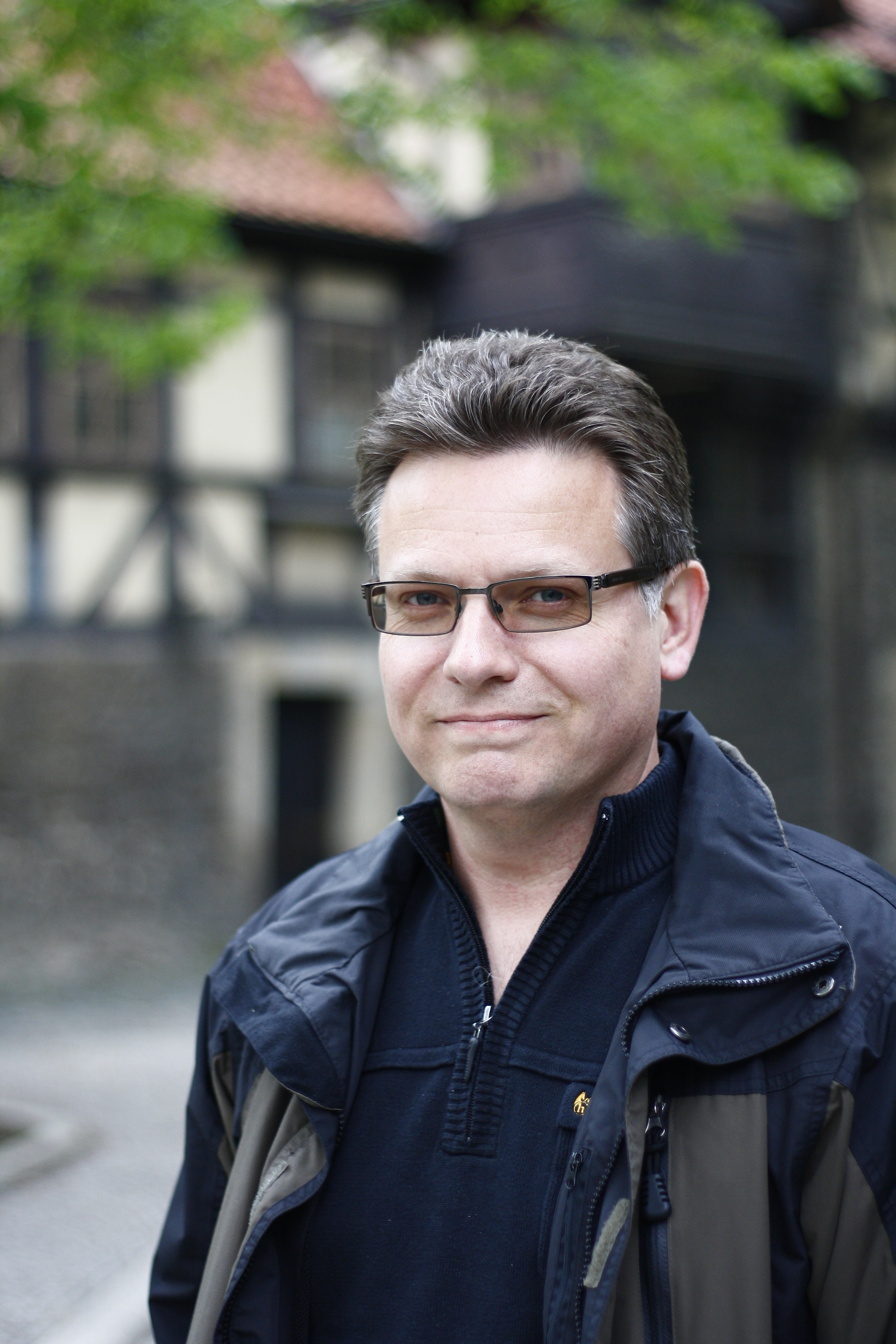
Bernhard Schneyer (2012)

Bernhard Schneyer (born 26 February 1968) is a German composer, conductor and music educator.

== Life ==
Schneyer was born in Wernigerode. Music has played an important role in his life since he was five years old. So from the age of six he received violin lessons at the music school in Wernigerode and later played in the orchestra of the music school. Later he also received additional piano lessons. From the age of 15 he continued his musical education in the special classes for music (today Landesgymnasium für Musik Wernigerode) in the same subjects as well as composition. At the same time he sang in the radio youth choir of Wernigerode. The active violin playing receded more and more into the background, but it has been preserved to this day in some points. He finished his school education in 1986 with the Abitur and the choirmaster qualification. Afterwards he completed his military service.

From 1988 to 1994 Schneyer studied at the Hochschule für Musik Carl Maria von Weber in the main subjects composition with Jörg Herchet and violin with Christian Redder. During his studies he changed his main subject from violin to piano with Gunnar Nauck. He finished his studies with a diploma and an artistic examination.

Since 1993 Schneyer has taught musical composition and music theory at the Konservatorium Georg Philipp Telemann in Magdeburg. From 1994 to 1995 he was also a teacher of music theory and composition, leader of the music school orchestra and a studio for electronic sound production at the Bernburg Music School. From 2001 Schneyer taught hearing training and composition at the Institute of Music of the Otto von Guericke University Magdeburg until its closure in 2010, and since 2008 he has also conducted the Youth Symphony Orchestra of Magdeburg.

== Voluntary work ==
In addition to his full-time work, Schneyer volunteered at his work places and in various associations:

- In 1993 he sang as bass in the Magdeburg Chamber Choir, took over a part of the management in 1998 and ended his membership in 2002.
- 1993 to 2000 he was chairman of the board of the state centre "Spiel & Theater" Sachsen-Anhalt e. V..
- 1994 to 2009 he assisted Frank Satzky in the Magdeburg Boys' Choir.
- since 1997 (with a break from 2005 to 2008) he is a member of the staff council of the G.-Ph.-Telemann Conservatory, which he has presided over since 2012.
- From 2005 he was a member of the presidium of the State Music Council of Saxony-Anhalt and from 2008 to 2012 its vice president.
- From 2008 to 2017 he was a member and chairman of the German Composers' Association State Representation Saxony-Anhalt.
- since 2008 he has been Chairman of the Board of Trustees of the Hans Stieber Foundation.
- since 2014 he is an employee representative of the Works Committee of the Conservatory G.-Ph.-Telemann.

== Educational work ==
=== Composer class(es) ===
At the beginning of his employment at the G.-Ph.-Telemann Conservatory, his growing composer class cooperated with that of his colleague Dieter Nathow to enable joint concerts by the students. After his retirement in 2002 Bernhard Schneyer took over the sole direction of the composer class in Magdeburg. Increasing participation of his students in courses of the composer class Halle-Dresden, which was led by Schneyer's fellow students, led to an ideal fusion of both classes. After the dissolution of the Halle-Dresden Composers' Class in 2007, the Saxony-Anhalt Composers' Class was formed and Schneyer took over as its director from 2008 to 2012. Since 2012 he has been deputy chairman.

=== Youth Symphony Orchestra Magdeburg ===
In 2008 he took over the direction of the Magdeburg Youth Symphony Orchestra. In the following years, Magdeburg's international concert tours and joint projects developed through town twinning. Thus the JSO was in Le Havre in 2014 and 2017 and in Radom in 2016. Return visits of the music schools have already taken place and are planned for the future. Financially this is only possible through benefit concerts, which the two Rotary Clubs of Magdeburg organize once a year for the orchestra.

== Discography ==
- 2009 "Sonnengesänge", including "Sonne (for soprano, flutes and piano)"

== Compositions ==
=== Orchestral work ===
==== Orchestra ====
- Spiegel for chamber orchestra (1990), premiere: 2005 Magdeburgische Philharmonie, Rainer Roos, publisher: Int. Sternscher Musikverlag Oberhausen
- In the decision for large orchestra (1991), premiere: 1993, Holzminden, University Symphony Orchestra Dresden, Milko Kersten
- Phase limits for string orchestra (2004), premiere: 2004, Wernigerode, Youth Chamber Orchestra, Peter Wegener
- Zwischen-Welt for large orchestra (2008), premiere: 2008, Magdeburg, Mitteldeutsche Kammerphilharmonie, Christian Simonis
- Morgenstern for wind orchestra and tubular bells (2008), premiere: 2008, Magdeburg, Youth Symphony Orchestra Magdeburg, Bernhard Schneyer
- Pluto for large orchestra (2010), premiere: 2010, Dessau, Anhaltische Philharmonie Dessau, Antony Hermus
- Luthroskop for plucked string orchestra (2011), premiere: 2011, Halle/S., String Ensemble Steglitz, Verlag Neue Musik Berlin
- Eiris for orchestra (2013), premiere: 2013, Schönebeck, Mitteldeutsche Kammerphilharmonie, Gerard Oskamp

==== Piano Concerts ====
- Daedalus für Klavier und Orchester (2010), premiere: 2011, Ilsenburg, Kristin Henneberg, Klavier, Jugendsinfonieorchester Magdeburg, Bernhard Schneyer, Verlag Neue Musik Berlin;

==== Other concertante work ====
- Super omnia ligna cedrorum for flute and string orchestra (2008)
- Perdix for flute and orchestra (2013), premiere: 2014, Le Havre (F), Annegret Dorn, flute, Jugendsinfonieorchester Magdeburg.

=== Opera and other stage works ===
- Ferdinand – ein Stier Schauspielmusik (1993), Premiere: 1993, Schönebeck/Elbe, Circus Chaos
- Die Bremer Stadtmusikanten Schauspielmusik (1994), Premiere: 1994, Bernburg, C.-M.-v.-Weber-Theater
- Der tote Tag, Chamber opera (1996)

=== Vocal pieces ===
- Choral songs for mixed chamber choir (1988)
- at night for soprano I + II and alto I + II (1998), text: Inga Lampert
- Evolutionen - a Buddhist Requiem for 3 mixed chamber choirs (2000), part premiere: 2000, Magdeburg, Magdeburg Chamber Choir, Lothar Hennig
- Sonne for soprano, flute and piano (2007), text: Thomas Lawall, premiere: 2007, Marburg, Trio Cantraiano, Verlag Neue Musik Berlin, CD: "Sonnengesänge" Audiomax Dabringhaus and Grimm
- Cold Song for mixed choir, harp and organ (2010), premiere: 2010, Halle/S., chamber choir "cantamus" Halle/S., Dorothea Köhler

=== Piano and organ works ===
- An(n)amnese for piano (1992), premiere: 1992, Dresden, Reiko Füting
- BRAGNERIANA for piano (2006), premiere: 2006, Halle, Maxim Böckelmann
- per aspera ad astra for piano (2007), premiere: 2008, Magdeburg, Maxim Böckelmann, k.o.m. musikverlag Berlin
- Pulsar for organ (2007), premiere: 2008, Halle, Wolfgang Stockmeier
- Autumn. colours for 2 pianos (2011), premiere: 2012, Magdeburg, Leon Luge and Felix Wuttig
- Blue Moon for organ (2012), premiere: 2012, Magdeburg, Matthias Mück

=== Chamber music ===
==== Strings ====
- String quartet I (1989), premiere: 2004, Halle, Philharmonic String Quartet Magdeburg
- 12 pieces for double bass alone, in twos, in threes (1991)
- String Quartet II (1997), premiere: 1998, Magdeburg, Philharmonic String Quartet Magdeburg
- Herbststück for 4 violins (1998), premiere: 1998, Magdeburg, violin quartet of the conservatory, cond. Helge Scholz
- Suite gothique for 2 violins and violoncello (2007), premiere: 2008, Conservatory Magdeburg, V: Int. Sternscher Musikverlag Oberhausen

==== Winds ====
- 10 pieces for wind quintet (1990)
- Zwischen-Zeit for wind quintet (2008), premiere: 2012, Mitteldeutsche Kammerphilharmonie, V: k.o.m. musikverlag Berlin

==== Duo and Trio ====
- Composition I for 3 trumpets and piano (1999)
- Play I for flute, violoncello and piano (2001), premiere: 2002, Magdeburg, Andrea Wüstenberg (fl.), Stephan Schulz (Vc), Christiane Biewald (clav.)
- Play II for flute, violoncello and piano (2003), premiere: 2003, Dresden, Karoline Schulz, Matthias Lorenz, Uwe Krause
- 3 pieces for violin (beginners) and piano (Möwe im Wind, Am Meer, Wetter-Spiel; 2004), Premiere: 2004, Magdeburg, Ina and Maxim Böckelmann, (3rd piece): 2018, Magdeburg, Ina and Maxim Böckelmann
- Play III for flute, double bass and piano (2005), premiere: 2004, Magdeburg, Sinfonietta Dresden
- Small Anagram for violin and piano (2006), premiere: 2007, Magdeburg, Ina and Maxim Böckelmann
- Retrospectives for 2 trumpets and organ (2007)

==== Other chamber music works ====
- Attempt at an articulation for flute, clarinet, bassoon and piano (1989), premiere: 2005, Magdeburg, members of the Magdeburg Philharmonic Orchestra;
- for five for flute, clarinet, viola, double bass and piano (1991), premiere: 1991, Dresden, student ensemble
- plucked plucked, shaken Measure for plucked orchestra (1998)
- Composition for recorder(s) and string quartet (2001), premiere: 2007, Magdeburg, Rüdiger Herrmann (bfl.) Arvos-Quartett;
- Vom Himmel hoch... for 2 violins and piano 4 hands (2003)
- tablet tablage for flute, violin, double bass and piano (2004), premiere: 2004, Magdeburg, Sinfonietta Dresden

=== Editing ===
- An der Saale hellem Strande (folk song arrangement) for mixed chamber choir (1996)
- Serenade in C (Tchaikovsky) (arrangement for large orchestra) (2010), premiere: 2010, Wernigerode, Youth Symphony Orchestra Magdeburg, Bernhard Schneyer;
- Luthroskop for plucked string orchestra (2011), premiere: 2011, Halle/S., Saiten-Ensemble Steglitz, V: Verlag Neue Musik Berlin;
- From heaven for string orchestra (2012)
