= Alex Burtzos =

American composer

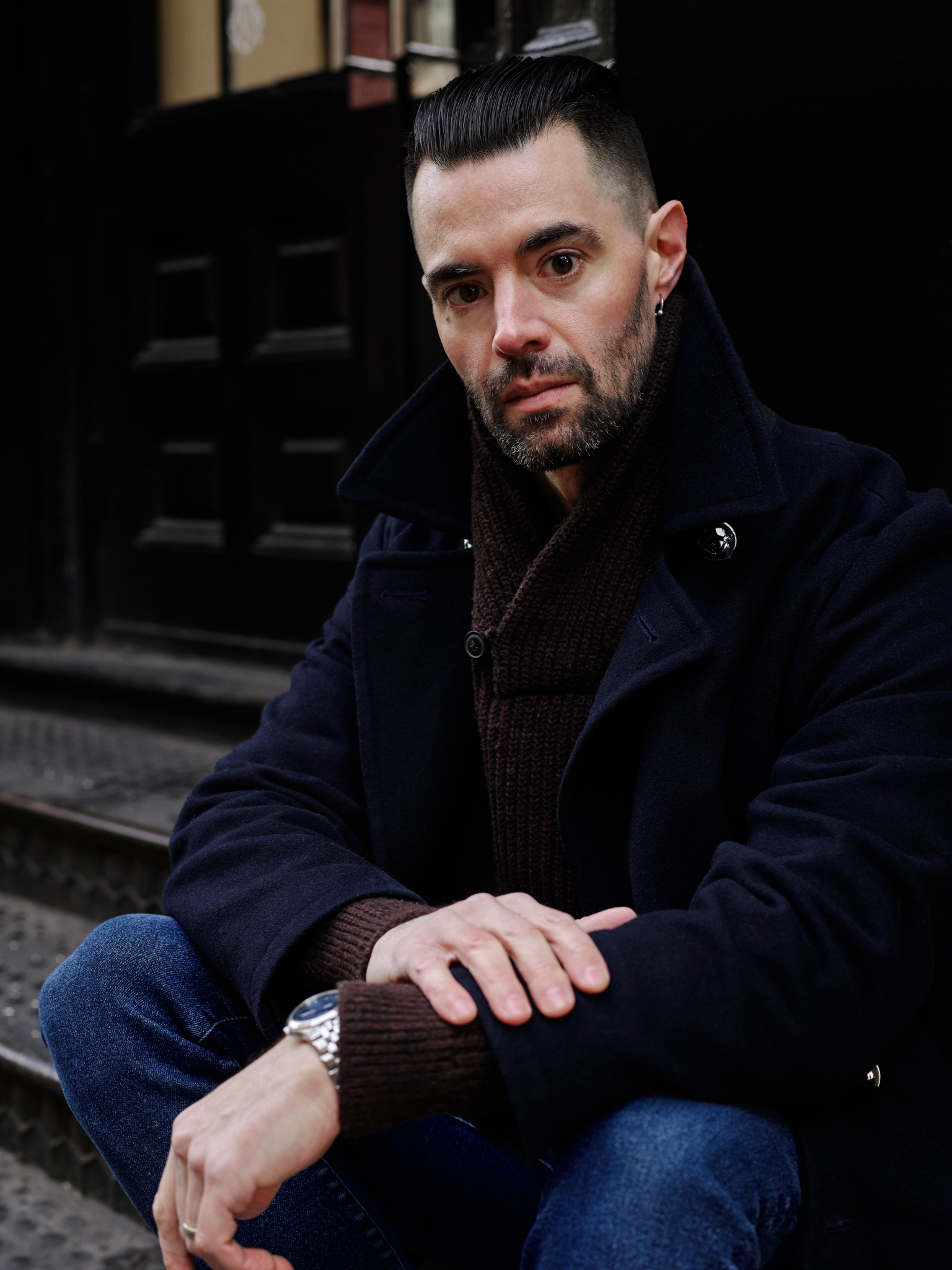
- Alex Burtzos in 2024
- Born: November 11, 1985 (age 41); Denver, Colorado
- Education: Loyola University New Orleans Manhattan School of Music
- Occupation: Composer
- Website: https://alexburtzosmusic.com/

Alex Burtzos (born 1985 in Denver, Colorado, United States) is an American composer based in New York City and Orlando, Florida.

== Life and career ==
Alex Burtzos was born in Denver, Colorado, and grew up in nearby Colorado Springs. He studied music at Loyola University New Orleans before moving to New York City in 2010, where he earned his doctorate in composition from Manhattan School of Music in 2016. His primary teachers include James Paton Walsh, J. Mark Stambaugh, and Reiko Fueting. Burtzos' music has been performed across four continents, and has received awards from numerous organizations within the United States. He has received particular attention for his compositions for authentic baroque-era instruments. Other of Burtzos' compositions utilize rappers, metal guitar, and other sounds drawn from popular music.

Burtzos is the founder of ICEBERG New Music, a composers collective based in New York City. In 2018, he was named the Endowed Chair of Composition Studies at The University of Central Florida.

== Compositions ==
=== Solo ===
- pWr (2021) for Cello Solo
- Perforation (2018) for Piano Solo
- Should the Wide World Roll Away (2018) for Piano Solo
- Wilfred Owen at the Gates (2015) for Piano Solo
- He Never Heard That Fleshless Chant (2011) for Oboe Solo
- Football in Marja (2011) for Piano Solo
- Baroque Fantasy on 'Go Down, Moses' (2008) for Organ Solo

=== Chamber ===
- Sin City (2023) for big band
- What We Wish to Remember of Ourselves (2021) for woodwind quartet and piano
- Relativity (2020) for three bassoons
- SEA (2020) for two vibraphonists
- Atoms (2020) for electric guitar and drum kit
- PIPES (2020) for 10 flutes
- King | Cawdor (2019) for violin, bass clarinet, cello, and piano
- Māyā (2019) for woodwind quintet
- R A G E (2018) for ensemble
- pOwer trIo (2018) for saxophone, piano, percussion
- The Birth of Dangun (2018) for piano trio
- we ain't got no $$$ honey but DAMN we got _____ (2017) for percussion quartet
- Megalopolis (2017) for saxophone ensemble
- The Hourglass Equation (2017) for flute, violin, bassoon, and harpsichord
- The F Word (2016) for amplified ensemble with MC
- SONATA/SONARE (2016) for trio sonata
- The Rembrandt of Avenue A (2015) for amplified ensemble with MC
- X Codes (2015) for violin, clarinet, and piano
- Alice and Zoltan 4ever (2014) for saxophone, bass trombone, and piano
- One Final Gyre (2014) for two saxophones
- OMAHA (all the things you could be you are you were) (2014) for string quartet
- The Impossible Object (2014) for violin and piano
- SXTG >;-) (2013) for clarinet, cello, and guitar
- Teach the Torches to Burn Bright (2013) for violin, clarinet, and piano
- 12.14.12 (2013) for ensembles
- Prince Prospero (2013) for soprano, flute, oboe, saxophone, guitar, piano, and percussion
- A Country of Vast Designs (2012) for string quartet
- The Revivalist (2012) for saxophone quartet
- March the Twenty-Fifth (2011) for woodwind quartet
- The Outlaw in the Gilded Age (2010) for violin, clarinet, saxophone, horn and piano

=== Choral and vocal ===
- Sky (2022) for soprano, baritone, and piano
- Five Arias from 'HE Who Gets Slapped' (2022) for five vocal soloists with piano
- Wooden Woman (2020) for singing cellist with chamber orchestra
- MIRABILIS (2018) for SSAATTBB chorus with string sextet
- Many Worlds I (2016) for baritone, trumpet, bass clarinet, and trombone
- The Explosion, and Other Tales (2016) for mezzo-soprano and piano
- Gursky Songs (2015) for baritone and piano trio
- Love and Loss and Loathing and Lizards (2015) for soprano, MC, and amplified ensemble
- Come Away Death (2012) for Countertenor and Harp with SATB chorus
- The Hill Wife (2012) for mezzo-soprano with ensemble
- Days Into Days (2011) for soprano with large ensemble

=== Electronic and mixed media ===
- The Turing Test (2019) for two guitars and fixed media
- LEGION (2017) for flute, piano, and fixed media
- When He First Appears (2017) for soprano, viola, harp, and fixed media
- MASKS (2016) for baritone, guitar, piano, and tape
- In a Cool, Green Hall (2010) for mixed media

=== Orchestra and wind ensemble ===
- d[RAM]edy (2023), concerto for piano and wind ensemble
- Arias and Interludes from 'HE Who Gets Slapped' (2022) for five vocal soloists and orchestra
- Echo Chamber (2019) for wind ensemble
- Pulse (2019) for orchestra
- The Black Riders (2013) for orchestra
- Sky Above Clouds (2011) for orchestra
- In Search of a Bird (2011) for chamber orchestra
- The Conqueror (2009) for wind ensemble
- Psyche (2009) for wind ensemble
- Colorado (2008) arranged for wind ensemble
- Colorado (2007) for orchestra

=== Opera ===
- HE Who Gets Slapped (2022), opera in two acts
