= Sylke Zimpel =

Sylke Zimpel (born 10 September 1959) is a German composer, choral conductor and lecturer.

== Life ==
Born in Dresden, Zimpel studied at the Cottbus conservatory from 1971 to 1978. She then studied composition at the Hochschule für Musik Carl Maria von Weber Dresden with Karl-Rudi Griesbach and Wilfried Krätzschmar until 1983. She studied further at the Hochschule für Musik Franz Liszt, Weimar, with Jürgen Puschbeck from 1990 to 1993, followed by a year of studies in choral conducting at the Conservatoire National Supérieur de Musique in Lyon with Nicole Corti-Lyant and Bernard Tétu.

She founded in 1986 the chorbühne TRITONUS (Choral stage tritone), and has conducted its choir. The ensemble achieved awards for performances of staged musical programs. In 1995, she founded the women's choir called femmes vocales, which she has also conducted.

As a composer, she focused on choral works for mixed choirs and women's choirs, including arrangements of folksongs from Eastern Europe including several Yiddish songs.

== Awards ==
- Fellowship of Saxony at Schloss Wiepersdorf in both 1998 and 2002
- First prize at the composition competition of the Chorverband Niedersachsen/Bremen in the category women's choir (2001)
- Fellowship at Villa Massimo (2007)
