= Gottfried Kluttig =

German Kantor and Kirchenmusikdirektor

Gottfried Kluttig (1 September 1913 – 14 March 2004) was a German Kantor and Kirchenmusikdirektor.

== Life ==
Kluttig was born in Friedersdorf near Frauenstein, in the then Kingdom of Saxony. After elementary school he attended the Sächsische Landesschule in Dresden. With the Abitur in 1933, he began studies at the Kirchenmusikalisches Institut of the University of Music and Theatre Leipzig. His teachers included Karl Hoyer in organ, Kurt Thomas in choral conducting and Johann Nepomuk David in composition.

After graduating in 1937, he entered the full-time kirchenmusikalische Ministry. He began his career at the Evangelical Lutheran Churches St. Markuskirche in Dresden-Pieschen as successor to the church musician Alfred Zimmer. During the Second World War, he was called up for military service, which was followed by a prisoner of war of several years. During this time, Max Lehmann was his substitute.

In 1950, he returned to St Mark's Church and helped to rebuild the congregation. In the 1950s, he initiated the renovation of the Eule organ damaged by the air bombing of Dresden. As the first post-war cantor in Dresden, he performed the Christmas Oratorio by Johann Sebastian Bach with his choirs and the Collegium musicum. This was followed by performances, among others of the Historia der Geburt Christi by Heinrich Schütz, the St John Passion by Johann Sebastian Bach, The Creationg by Joseph Haydn and the Requiem by Anton Bruckner.

In 1961, he became cantor at the Stadtkirche Radeberg. In the parish he abolished the separation of boys' and girls' choirs and established a mixed Children's Choir, the Kurrende Radeberg. At the same time he became Kirchenmusikdirektor (KMD) in the Kreis Dresden-Land. After the departure of KMD Harry Kaiser, he was again involved with reconstruction processes here. Thus, in the 1970s, he accompanied the installation of the Herbig organ. After the dissolution of the church district in 1978, he took over the position as KMD in the church district Dresden-Nord. He retired in 1983; his successor in Radeberg was Wolfgang Junghanß.

He took the regional church music director Alfred Stier as a model in his music pedagogical work and published a two-volume singing school in 1970. In addition, he was involved in Catholic catechesis training at the Amalie-Sieveking-Haus in Radebeul and as a lecturer for choir and children's choir direction at the Dresden Regional Church Music School.

Most recently, he lived in a senior citizens' residence in Radeberg. His son Christian Kluttig (born 1943) became a conductor.

Kluttig died in Dresden at the age of 90.

== Publications ==
- Ein methodischer Lehrgang zur Musikerziehung des Chorsängers. Dargestellt nach der Tonika-do-Lehre. 2 volumes: Einführung und Arbeitshilfen für den Kantor and Fibel für den Chorschüler. Kirchenchorwerk der Evangelisch-lutherischen Landeskirche Sachsens, Dresden 1970.
