= Thomas Hertel =

German composer (1951–2024)

- Hertel c. 2020
- Born: 1951; Bad Salzungen, Thuringia, East Germany
- Died: 9 December 2024 (aged 73); Leipzig, Saxony, Germany
- Occupation: Composer
- Organizations: Staatsschauspiel Dresden; Schauspiel Leipzig
- Awards: Hans Stieber Prize; Hanns Eisler Prize

Thomas Hertel (1951 – 9 December 2024) was a German composer. He was head of incidental music at the Staatsschauspiel Dresden from 1974 to 1982. In 1985, he left East Germany. He focused on musical-scenic projects, for example at the Donaueschinger Musiktage and the Lucerne Festival. He taught in Hamburg, Bochum, Frankfurt and Munich. From 2002 to 2008 he was head of incidental music at the Schauspiel Leipzig.

== Life and career ==
Hertel was born in Bad Salzungen, Thuringia, in 1951. After his Abitur in the special branch for music in Wernigerode, Hertel studied musicology in Halle from 1969 to 1973. Afterwards he was a master student for composition at the Academy of Arts, Berlin, with Siegfried Matthus.

Hertel was head of incidental music at the Staatsschauspiel Dresden from 1974 to 1982. He worked as a freelance composer and head of the Young Composers Section in the Dresden Composers' Association. He composed two commissioned operas, Leonce and Lena and Till. He received composition prizes in Halle and the Hans Stieber Prize of the Radio of East Germany. His compositions were promoted by two Leipzig music publishers Peters and Deutscher Verlag für Musik. Travelling to Pierre Boulez and IRCAM in Paris was not granted to him. He was banned from working on and realising cross-genre projects.

Hertel left East Germany in 1985 for artistic, cultural and political reasons; he devoted himself primarily to the realisation of musical-scenic projects, among them Cernunnos for 7 reed players, bulls and live electronics for the 1993 Donaueschinger Musiktage edition with the Experimentalstudio des SWR; the opening installation for the 1996 Lucerne Festival aus der erde durch den wind – a mobile open-air music for various wind, vocal and bell ensembles and the sound transport of natural sound samples, and in 1999 the cartoon opera Das Biest des Monsieur Racine after Tomi Ungerer commissioned by the Theater Basel. In 1991, he received the Art Prize of the City of Munich for experimental theatre.

He held teaching posts at music academies and drama schools among others in Hamburg, Bochum, Frankfurt and Munich. He realised numerous commissioned works, song recitals and theatre music for over 40 German-speaking theatres. He returned to Leipzig and was from 2002 to 2008 head of incidental music at the Schauspiel Leipzig; there he created the experimental musical-scenic series mund & knie 1–12, for which he was awarded the Leipzig Theatre Prize in 2009.

Hertel died in Leipzig after a long illness, on 9 December 2024, at the age of 73.

== Awards ==
- 1982: Hans Stieber Prize
- 1982: Hanns Eisler Prize
- 1991: Kunstpreis der Landeshauptstadt München
- 2009: Leipziger Theaterpreis
