= Michael Wüstefeld =

German writer

Michael Wüstefeld (born 12 September 1951) is a German writer.

== Life ==
Born in Dresden, Wüstefeld studied agricultural engineering at the TU Dresden from 1970 to 1974 and graduated with a diploma in engineering after passing the Abitur and the certificate for mechanical engineering. From 1974 to 1991 he worked as a technologist in an engineering office in Dresden. After unemployment in 1992 and a job as an office assistant, he has lived and worked as a freelance author and critic in Dresden since 1993.

He publishes lyric poetry and prose. In keeping with the other media-involving approach of his earliest publications in connection with prints, his work also includes a libretto. Wüstefeld's work has been and continues to be honored by numerous prizes and scholarships.

From 1989 to 2009 he was a co-founder and member of the Independent Writers Association Dresden. Since 1996 Wüstefeld has been a member of the PEN Centre Germany.

== Work ==
- Kinogeschichten. Dresden 2016
- Fünfkirchen fünf vor zwölf. Ein Pécs-Tagebuch. Dresden 2016
- Märchen von einem, den es als Schloßschreiber aufs Land zog. Rheinsberg 2014
- Paris geschenkt. Dresden, 2008
- Das AnAlphabet. Göttingen, 2007
- Schlüsseloper : ein burleskes Spiel, libretto for an opera by Wilfried Krätzschmar, world premiere 2 December 2006 in Dresden
- Blaues Wunder. Dresdens wunderlichste Brücke. Berlin, 2002
- Wegzehrung : Gedichte. Munich, 2001
- Schobers Zimmer : Erzählung. Dresden, 1998
- Deutsche Anatomie, Dülmen-Hiddingsel, 1996
- Amsterdamer Gedichte. Dresden, 1994
- Grenzstreifen. Warmbronn, 1993
- Nackt hinter der Schutzmaske : Erinnerungen. Aufbau-Verlag, 1990
- Stadtplan, Aufbau-Verlag, 1990
- Heimsuchung : Gedichte. Aufbau-Verlag, 1987
- grafiklyrik 2. 6 Gedichte mit 7 Holzschnitten von Peter Herrmann, Obergrabenpresse, 1979

== Awards ==
- 1990: Walter-Hasenclever-Literaturpreis
- 1993: Scholarship Stiftung Künstlerdorf Schöppingen
- 1997: Scholarship Villa Waldberta
- 1999: Scholarship Künstlerhaus Edenkoben
- 2007: Scholarship Denkmalschmiede Höfgen
- 2010: Scholarship of the Calwer Hermann-Hesse-Stiftung
- 2012: Residence scholarship in Pécs
- 2014: Stadtschreiber zu Rheinsberg
