= Ralf Hoyer =

German composer

Ralf Hoyer (born 13 April 1950) is a German composer.

== Life ==
Born in Berlin, Hoyer studied sound engineering at the Hochschule für Musik "Hanns Eisler". Afterwards, he was a sound director at VEB Deutsche Schallplatten Berlin and from 1977 to 1980, Meisterschüler for composition with Ruth Zechlin and Georg Katzer at the Academy of Arts, Berlin. In 1991, he founded the Initiative Neue Musik Berlin. From 1995 to 1998, he was chairman of the Berlin section of the Deutscher Komponistenverband. From 2010 to 2013, he was chairman of the Berliner Gesellschaft für Neue Musik. His works have been performed in Europe and the US.

== Film scores ==
- 1990: Sehnsucht
- 1991: Tanz auf der Kippe

== Awards ==
- 1983: Hans Stieber Prize
- 1985: Hanns Eisler Prize
- 1987: Critic prize of the Berliner Zeitung
