= Diether de la Motte =

German composer and musicologist (1928–2010)

- Born: 30 March 1928; Bonn, Germany
- Died: 15 May 2010 (aged 82); Berlin, Germany
- Education: Hochschule für Musik Detmold
- Occupations: Composer; Music theorist; Music critic
- Organizations: Rheinische Post; Schott Music; Musikhochschule Hamburg; Academy of Arts, Berlin; Musikhochschule Hannover; Wiener Musikakademie

Diether de la Motte (30 March 1928 – 15 May 2010) was a German musician, composer, music theorist, music critic and academic teacher.

== Life ==
Born in Bonn, de la Motte studied at the Hochschule für Musik Detmold from 1947 to 1950, composition with Wilhelm Maler, choral conducting with Kurt Thomas, and piano. From 1950 to 1959 he was a lecturer for composition, theory of form and piano at the Düsseldorf Kirchenmusikschule. From 1955, he wrote music reviews for the Rheinische Post. From 1959 to 1962, he worked as an editor at Schott Musikverlag in Mainz. He took courses at Darmstädter Ferienkurse, with Ernst Krenek, among others.

From 1962, de la Motte taught composition and music theory at the Musikhochschule Hamburg and was appointed a professor there in 1964. In 1972, he became president of the Academie of Arts, Berlin. In 1982 he was appointed professor at the Musikhochschule Hannover. In 1988, he accepted a call as professor of music theory, a new chair at the Wiener Musikakademie, where he taught until 1996. Among his students were Detlev Glanert, Clemens Kühn, Nikolaus Schapfl, Manfred Trojahn and Franz Zaunschirm.

De la Motte was married to Helga de la Motte-Haber. They lived in Vienna until 2006 when they moved back to Berlin. He died there at the age of 82.

== Work ==
The compositional output of de la Motte encompasses almost all genres and ranges, from traditional forms such as stage work, orchestral, vocal and chamber music to experimental events, performances and pieces with ground-breaking ideas. His opera Der Aufsichtsrat, to a libretto by Rolf Schneider, was premiered at the Staatsoper Hannover on 1 February 1970. He wrote an opera so oder so (Like This or That), five scenic variations to his own libretto, which was first performed at the Hamburg State Opera on 10 April 1975.

Besides his compositional work, de la Motte is widely known as a music theorist. His writings belong to the standard literature for students of music and musicology. He wrote fundamental books on musical analysis, counterpoint and harmony. His archive is held by the Ackademy of Arts, containing autographs and prints of both compositions and written publications such as monographies, essays and lectures, his correspondence with Gottfried von Einem, Wolfgang Fortner, Hans Werner Henze, Friederike Mayröcker and Bernd Alois Zimmermann, concert programs, reviews and photographies.

== Publications ==
- Hans Werner Henze. Der Prinz von Homburg. Schott, Mainz 1960
- Harmonielehre. Bärenreiter-Verlag Karl Vötterle, Kassel/Basel/Tours/London, and dtv, Munich 1976; additional editions: Deutscher Verlag für Musik, Wiesbaden 1977, dtv, Munich 2004, ISBN 3-423-30166-X.
- Musikalische Analyse. Textteil u. Notenteil. 2 volumes. Bärenreiter, Kassel 1978, ISBN 978-3-7618-0141-3.
- Musik bewegt sich im Raum. 16 Konzepte für Laien-Professionals aus Musik, Sprache, Sprachmusik und Bewegung. Moeck, Celle 1987, ISBN 978-3-87549-027-5. OCLC 1073928059
- Kontrapunkt. Ein Lese- und Arbeitsbuch. Bärenreiter, Munich 1981 u. dtv, Munich 2002, ISBN 3-423-30146-5. OCLC 1014135405
- Melodie. Ein Lese- und Arbeitsbuch. dtv, Munich 1993, ISBN 3-423-04611-2. OCLC 1077428407
- Musik Formen. Phantasie, Einfall, Originalität. Wißner, Augsburg 1999, ISBN 3-89639-160-7. OCLC 42430648
- Wege zum Komponieren. Ermutigung und Hilfestellung. Bärenreiter, Kassel 2001, ISBN 3-7618-1290-6. OCLC 821213789
- Gedichte sind Musik. Musikalische Analysen von Gedichten aus 800 Jahren. Bärenreiter, Kassel 2002, ISBN 3-7618-1572-7. OCLC 750582104
