= Ingeborg Finke-Siegmund =

German woman classical pianist

Ingeborg Finke-Siegmund, born Siegmund, (4 December 1919 – 1 January 2012) was a German pianist and piano teacher.

== Life ==
Finke-Siegmund was born in 1919 into a large family of the pastor and later Dresden superintendent Ringulf Siegmund (1889-1969) in Bohemian city of Aš. After the National Socialist takeover, her father was dismissed and arrested.

At the age of sixteen she entered the conservatory. She first studied with Walter Schaufuß-Bonini. Later she continued her training with Conrad Hansen, Franz Langer and Hugo Steurer. She gave her first solo recital in Dresden in 1942. She was active as a soloist until 1952. After that, she worked at the Hochschule für Musik Carl Maria von Weber Dresden. Her students included among others Peter Rösel, Sonnhild Fiebach, Christina Haupt, Ralf-Carsten Brömsel, Steffen Leißner, Christian Kluttig, Hans-Peter Richter and Hartmut Haenchen.

At Deutscher Verlag für Musik she co-edited the collection of contemporary compositions in piano lessons Für junge Pianisten.

She was married to the Dresden pianist, composer, piano pedagogue and music critic Hermann Werner Finke (1911-1988).
