= Eberhard Büchner =

German opera singer

Eberhard Büchner (born 6 November 1939 in Dresden) is a German operatic and concert tenor. He made his debut in 1964 as Tamino in Mozart's Die Zauberflöte at the Mecklenburg State Theatre.

== Recordings ==
- Franz Schubert: Messe G-Dur for soprano, tenor, bass, choir, strings and organ: D 167
- Johann Sebastian Bach: St Matthew Passion Peter Schreier – Dresdner Kapellknaben, Rundfunkchor Leipzig, Staatskapelle Dresden Ausschnitte ! – Aufgenommen 1984 in der Lukaskirche zu Dresden Eterna Edition, 1984.
- Eberhard Büchner singt Arien aus deutschen Opern. O. Nicolai, A. Lortzing, Fr. von Flotow, R. Strauss (countess: Magdalena Hajossyova, soprano) R. Wagner. Staatskapelle Berlin, conductor Otmar Suitner
- Beethoven, Ludwig van: Sinfonie Nr. 4 B-dur op. 60 u. Sinfonie Nr. 9 d-moll op. 125. Dresdner Philharmonie. conductor: Herbert Kegel. Rundfunkchor Leipzig u. Rundfunkchor Berlin. Soloists: Alison Hargan, Ute Walther, Eberhard Büchner and Kolos Kovats. Recording: 1983 Dresden
- Georg Friedrich Handel: Ode for St. Cecilia´s Day Monika Frimmer – Soprano, Eberhard Büchner – Tenor, Ein Kammerchor, Händel-Festspielorchester Halle, conductor: Christian Kluttig, ETERNA 1982
- Zwei Herzen im Dreivierteltakt. - Robert Stolz-Melodien Berlin: VEB Dt. Schallplatten, 1981, 33er-Schallplatte im Original-Cover (AMIGA) (stereo 845 182) ISBN stereo 845 182
- J. S. Bach: Kantaten Der Himmel lacht! Die Erde jubilieret, BWV 31 / Erfreut euch, ihr Herzen, BWV 66 (Thomanerchor, Gewandhausorchester, conductor: Hans-Joachim Rotzsch)
