= Hans-Dieter Karras =

German composer

Hans-Dieter Karras (born 1 November 1959) is a German church musician, composer and organist.

== Training ==
Born in Jena, Karras began his organ studies with Karl Frotscher and Herbert Collum in Dresden. He then studied composition and orchestral conducting (with Manfred Weiss, Karl-Rudi Griesbach and Siegfried Kurz) at the Hochschule für Musik Carl Maria von Weber in Dresden. After moving to the Federal Republic of Germany in 1978 he studied church music at the Hochschule für Kirchenmusik der Evangelischen Kirche von Westfalen, where he passed his exams in 1983. He supplemented his studies with master classes in Paris with Gaston Litaize, Odile Pierre, Jean Guillou and Jean Langlais.

== Ecclesiastical offices ==
- 1982–2001 Kantor and organist at the Brüdernkirche St. Ulrici in Braunschweig
- since 2001 Eastern Group Cantorate of the Propstei Braunschweig and cantor of the Riddagshausen Abbey

== Concert activity ==
Karras has given concerts in most European countries, Russia, North and South America, West Africa and Oceania. As a pianist and organist he also works as a chamber music and song accompanist. His compositions have been published by Prospect, Darcey Press and Edition Sonox, CD recordings with Karras have been released by the labels Prospect and Sicus Klassik.

== Compositions ==
- Sonata da chiesa per flauto e organo
- Concerto in fine tempore for flute and string orchestra
- Symphony Nr. 1 for soprano solo, timpani and string orchestra
- Symphony Nr. 2 Dresdner for organ, piano and large orchestra
- Symphony Nr. 3 Bilder aus Honduras for large orchestra
- Symphony Nr. 4 Sinfonia concertante for piano and chamber orchestra
- Symphony Nr. 5 Das Lied von den Engeln für Soli, Chor und großes Orchester
- Symphony Nr. 6 Sacra for four orchestral groups, Gregorian chorale choirs and organ
- String Quartet No. 1
- Concerto Brunsvigensis I for four transverse flutes or two transverse flutes and string orchestra
- Tryptique for organ or saxophone (also horn) and organ
- Sonata impressionistique for oboe (also flute or violin) and organ
- Concerto Brunsvigensis II
- Fantasia Argentina for violin solo
- Jesaja Cantata for soprano or tenor solo, choir and chamber orchestra
- Introit für Orgel
- Festival Evensong in C für Chor und Orgel
- Missa St. Laurentius for solos, choir and organ (orchestra)
- Partita Verleih uns Frieden gnädiglich for organ
- Partita Unser Herrscher for organ
- Partita Werde munter mein Gemüte for organ (it is the melody of J. S. Bach's Jesu, Joy of Man's Desiring)
- Partita Charlestown for organ (Amerikanisches Volkslied, 1799)
- Partita Nun komm, der Heiden Heiland for organ
- Partita Liebster Jesu, wir sind hier for organ

== Discography ==
- Theodore Dubois: Das gesamte Orgelwerk (five issues of planned seven on the Cavaillé-Coll-Organ of La Madeleine in Paris)
- Arthur William Foote: Das gesamte Orgelwerk (double-CD at the Aeolian-Skinner/Fritz-Noack-Orgel of the Episcopal Church of the Incarnation, Dallas, Texas)
- Highlights der Orgelmusik, Works in original and arrangements of Bach, Lang, Humperdinck, Karg-Elert, Elgar, Mozart, Wagner, Albinoni, Vierne, Archer and Widor
- Große Orgelwerke von Bach, Grigny, Renner und Guilmant aus der Brüdernkirche Braunschweig
- Joseph Jongen: Symphonie concertante op. 81 für Orgel und Orchester
- Weihnachtliche Orgelmusik der Romantik – Volume 1: Deutschland, Werke von Reger, Weidenhagen, Herzogenberg, Liszt, Laurischkus, Führer, Adler, Kraft und Merkel
- Orgelmusik von Acht bis Mitternacht: Live-Konzertmitschnitte der Reihe in Braunschweigs Brüdernkirche 1990–1999
- Ave Maria im Spiegel der Zeiten: 33 Ave Maria settings from five centuries; Ingeborg Hischer (mezzo-soprano), Hans-Dieter Karras (organ); 2 CDs SICUS Klassik
- Arien und Kantaten des Barock by Vivaldi, J. S. Bach, J. Chr. Bach, Händel; Ingeborg Hischer (mezzo-soprano), Hans-Dieter Karras (organ), Concertino Braunschweig; CD SICUS Klassik
- Suiten für Orgel aus vier Jahrhunderten, Volume 1: Works by Froberger, Clérambault, Bach, Boëllmann, de Séverac, Young; CD SICUS Klassik
