= Clemens Kühn =

German musicologist (born 1945)

Clemens Kühn (born 1945) is a German music theorician.

== Life ==
Born in Hamburg, Kühn studied School music, Germanistic in Hamburg and Berlin as well as Music theory and composition with Diether de la Motte. In 1977 he was awarded a doctorate in musicology as a student of Carl Dahlhaus. After teaching at the Berlin University of the Arts and the University of Music and Performing Arts Munich, he was appointed to the chair of music theory at the Hochschule für Musik Carl Maria von Weber in Dresden in 1997.

Kühn was a staff member and editor of various periodicals, including from 1978 to 1996 co-editor and editor of the Musica magazine.

== Publications ==
- Das Zitat in der Musik der Gegenwart – mit Ausblicken auf bildende Kunst und Literatur. Hamburg 1972.
- Musiklehre. Laaber-Verlag, Laaber 1981.
- Gehörbildung im Selbststudium. Bärenreiter, Kassel 1983. (11th edition 2004.)
- Formenlehre der Musik. Munich and Kassel 1987. (7th edition 2004.)
- Analyse lernen. Bärenreiter, Kassel 1993, ISBN 3-7618-1154-3.
- Kompositionsgeschichte in kommentierten Beispielen. Bärenreiter, Kassel 1998.
- Musiktheorie unterrichten – Musik vermitteln. Bärenreiter, Kassel 2006, ISBN 3-7618-1835-1.
- Musik erforschen. Ein Arbeitsbuch zu „Ordnungen in der Musik“ für die Jahrgänge 7 bis 9/10. Altenmedingen 2008, ISBN 978-3-937628-10-3.
- Modulation kompakt : Erkunden - Erleben - Erproben - Erfinden. Bärenreiter, Kassel 2013, ISBN 978-3-7618-2334-7.
