= Wilfried Krätzschmar =

German composer

Wilfried Krätzschmar (born 23 March 1944) is a German composer.

== Life ==
Born in Dresden, Krätzschmar received piano lessons from 1952. After his Abitur at the Julius-Ambrosius-Hülße-Gymnasium he studied composition with Johannes Paul Thilman from 1962 to 1968, piano with Wolfgang Plehn and conducting with Klaus Zoephel at the Hochschule für Musik Carl Maria von Weber Dresden. In 1963 he conducted a trombone choir in Dresden. From 1968 to 1969 he took over the direction of incidental music at Theater Meiningen. After this time he returned to the Dresden Academy of Music as an aspirant of Fritz Geißler. In 1975 he took over artistically the Centre for the Promotion of Young Composers of the District of Dresden. In 1988 he was appointed extraordinary professor in Dresden. From 1991 to 2003 he was rector of the Dresden University of Music and from 1992 to 2009 full professor for musical composition. In 2003 he was appointed president of the Sächsischer Musikrat. From 2011 to 2014 Krätzschmar was vice president and from 2014 to 2017 President of the Sächsische Akademie der Künste.

== Awards ==
- 1971 Förderpreis des Carl-Maria-von-Weber-Wettbewerbes
- 1972 and 1973 Mendelssohn Scholarship des Ministeriums für Kultur
- 1979 Hans Stieber Prize of the Komponistenverbandes Halle
- 1980 Hanns-Eisler-Preis des Rundfunks der DDR
- 1985 Martin-Andersen-Nexö-Kunstpreis
- 1986 Art Prize of the German Democratic Republic
- 1990 Kritikerpreis der DDR-Musiktage
- 2012 Johann Walter Plakette des Sächsischen Musikrates

== Compositions ==
- 1974: Suoni notturni for solo flute and ensemble, UA Dresden
- 1976: Hölderlin-Fragmente for solo flute and ensemble, UA Dresden
- 1979: 1. Sinfonie, UA Dresden
- 1980: 2. Sinfonie Explosionen und Cantus, UA Berlin
- 1982: Heine-Szenen for baritone, choirs, organ and orchestra, UA Leipzig
- 1982: 3. Sinfonie, UA Berlin
- 1985: 4. Sinfonie, UA Dresden
- 1987: scenario piccolo for piano and ensemble, UA Dresden
- 1987: cataracta for orchestra, UA Berlin
- 1988: Kammerkonzert II, UA Schwerin
- 1991: und schon jetzt for two choirs and large ensemble, UA Dresden
- 1993: Klanggewächse for orchestra, UA Pirna
- 1993: Nachspiel zum Vormittag eines Ubu for ensemble, UA Berlin
- 1995: Reigen for orchestra, UA 1995 Dresden
- 1996: turns for six percussionists, UA Dresden
- 1998: Kammerkonzert III, UA Dresden
- 2003: age, spectra sonantia temporibus for orchestra, UA Dresden
- 2006: Galopp – mouvement, UA Leipzig
- 2006: Schlüsseloper. Ein burleskes Spiel, libretto Michael Wüstefeld, UA Dresden
- 2008: maga musica, Hymn for children choirs, UA Dresden
- 2009: Doch es wird nicht dunkel bleiben for choir and percussion ensemble, UA Dresden
- 2012: Fragmentum for two choirs and orchestra, UA Dresden
- 2019: 5th Symphony, UA Dresden

== Students ==
Among his students were Michael Flade, Arnulf Herrmann, Caspar René Hirschfeld, Alexander Keuk, Ekkehard Klemm, Uwe Krause, Rolf Thomas Lorenz, Christian Münch, Theodor Schubach and Sylke Zimpel.
