= Karsten Gundermann =

German composer

Karsten Gundermann (born 1 October 1966) is a German composer.

== Life ==
Born in Dresden, Gundermann attended Hans Jürgen Wenzel's children's composer class and then studied at the Dresdner Musikhochschule with Udo Zimmermann.

From 1990 he studied at the National Academy for Chinese Theatre in Beijing. In 1993 he composed there the Beijing Opera The Nightingale based on a fairy tale by Hans Christian Andersen. The opera was performed in 2010 as part of the Rheingau Musik Festival at Palais am Zoo in Frankfurt.

In 2003 he composed the Chinese-German Seasons and Times of Day based on the eponymous cycle of poems by Johann Wolfgang von Goethe, commissioned by the RIAS Kammerchores and the Concerto Köln. In June 2010 his compositional arrangement of Le cinesi, a baroque opera with music by Christoph Willibald Gluck and a libretto by Pietro Metastasio, was premiered at the Musikfestspiele Potsdam Sanssouci.

== Films ==
- 2002: Verrückt nach Paris
- 2002: Abgedreht
- 2010: Faust II reloaded – Den lieb ich, der Unmögliches begehrt!

== Writings ==
- Echt clever! Geniale Erfindungen aus Hamburg.
- Secret Sounds Musik und Klang aus China.
