= Fiduciary trust =

A fiduciary trust is a fiduciary relationship in which a trustee holds the title to assets for the beneficiary. The trust's creator is called the grantor and a fiduciary trust is structured under trust law.

One usage of the term "fiduciary trust" is to distinguish the word "trust" from usage in general contexts where it does not imply a trustee-beneficiary relationship, and also sometimes to distinguish it from implied trusts (such as some constructive trusts and some resulting trusts) in which the trustee does not have express intent of a major fiduciary duty involving nontrivial discretion on the part of the trustee.

== Trustee duties ==
A fiduciary trust is characterized by the trustee’s legal obligation to administer the trust property for the benefit of the beneficiary. In trust law, trustees owe fiduciary duties of loyalty, care, good faith, and, where there is more than one beneficiary, impartiality.

The trustee holds legal title to the trust property, while the beneficiary holds the beneficial interest. This division between legal and beneficial ownership is a defining feature of an express trust relationship.
