= Rolf Thomas Lorenz =

German composer and music teacher (born 1959)

Rolf Thomas Lorenz (born 19 May 1959 in Klingenthal) is a German composer and music teacher.

== Life ==
From 1974 to 1982 Lorenz received composition lessons from Jürgen Golle in Zwickau. From 1978 to 1982 he studied composition, clarinet and piano at the conservatory "Carl Maria von Weber" in Dresden with Wilfried Krätzschmar, Josef Oehl, and Hermann W. Finke. Since 1982 Lorenz has been teaching clarinet, composition and music theory at the Heinrich-Schütz-Conservatory Dresden, and he also works as a freelance composer. Since 2004 he has been chairman of the Dresden working group of the German Composers' Association.

== Prizes ==
- 1. Prize of the 2nd Saxon Composition Competition 2001 organized by the Sächsischer Musikrat (Drei Bagatellen für 3 Trompeten und 2 Posaunen, Musikverlag Friedrich Hofmeister, Leipzig)

== Compositions ==
- Kaleidoskop für 4 B-Klarinetten und Bassklarinette. Musikverlag Friedrich Hofmeister, Leipzig
- Columbus Skteches for Columbus Symphony Youth Orchestra, 2001
- Solo della ramificazione 1982/2003 for clarinet, Musikverlag Breitkopf & Härtel, Leipzig
- 3 Nocturnes pour clarinette solo 2010/11, self edition
- Drei Bagatellen für 2 Trompeten und 3 Posaunen, 2000, Musikverlag Friedrich Hofmeister, Leipzig
- Sonate für Klarinette und Klavier, 1984, Musikverlag Friedrich Hofmeister, Leipzig
- Divertimento für Klarinettenseptett, 1986, Musikverlag Johann Kliment KG, Vienna
- Toccata für Akkordeon, 2006, Musikverlag Friedrich Hofmeister, Leipzig
- Sonatine für Trompete und Klavier. 2000, Musikverlag Bruno Uetz, Halberstadt
- Swingin Sketch for clarinet and piano 2011
- Capriccio für Bassett horn solo. 2012, Edition Andel, Belgien
- Summer Days for recorder quintet, 2012, Edition Andel, Belgien
- Capriccio für Flöte und Klavier 2013, for Iwona Glinka, Athens,
- Tarantella für Klarinette und Klavier. 2013 Edition Andel, Belgium
- Impressionen für Flöte und Klavier, Edition Andel, Belgium
- Capriccietto für Klarinette und Klavier, Verlag Johann Kliment KG, Vienna
- Mein erstes Konzert. for clarinet and piano, Verlag Johann Kliment KG
- 3 Stücke für Hornquartett, Musikverlag Johann Kliment KG
- Dresdner Festmarsch for the 800th anniversary of Dresden for wind orchestra, Musikverlag Johann Kliment
- 3 Bagatellen für Flöte und Klavier, Edition Andel, Belgien
- Suite für 4 Gitarren, manuscript
- Sonate für Trompete und Klavier, Edition Andel, Belgien
- Suite für Zupforchester, Ebert-Verlag Leipzig, Commissioned by the Landeszupforchester Sachsen
- Sonatine für Horn und Klavier
- Sonatine für Fagott und Klavier
