= Robert Linke =

German Artist and Composer

Robert Linke (born in 1958) is a German artist and composer.

== Life ==
Born in Leipzig, Linke has been living in Berlin, Saxony and Bohemia since 1983. He works alone or in music ensembles with experimental texts, drawings, music and films and organizes events.

Linke is also active as an author. Two parts of his play Die Arbeitslosen aus dem Cafe Schliemann were published in the Berlin literary magazine Sklaven in 1995 (issue 18) and 1997 (issues 38/39). In the literary magazine Floppy Myriapoda texts by him were published in 2012 (issue 19) and 2014 (issues 24/25).

Since 2010 Linke also participates as outsider art-drawer in exhibitions at the Kunsthaus Kannen, Münster. Since 2011 he has been a member of the board of directors of the Weltfluchthilfe ae.V., Berlin.

In 1989, Linke composed the music for Rainer Simon's film Die Besteigung des Chimborazo. In 1991 his Tannhäuser-Requiem was premiered at the Kleine Szene, the studio stage of the Dresden Semperoper, and one week later it was also performed at the Marstall München. There is a recording of the Gruppe Neue Musik Hanns Eisler under the direction of Friedrich Goldmann performing Linke's composition Fortpflanzung / Notgezücht. Musik Christian Heckel.

Since 1992 Linke has been living with an ensemble of artists from social services. The ensemble documents and represents the culture of the unemployed with their utopias of a modern society in the projects Opera for the unemployed, Kinderoper, Medea-Psyche, the indoors orchestra, Stone Age laboratory and Initiative of Intelligent Forms of Life.
