= Gerd Domhardt =

German composer

Gerd Domhardt (19 February 1945 in Wolmirstedt – 18 February 1997 in Halle) was a German composer.

Domhardt grew up in Schleusingerneundorf. He studied music education, German studies and musicology at the University of Halle-Wittenberg from 1963 to 1968. From 1973 to 1976 he was a master student for composition with Ruth Zechlin at the Academy of the Arts, Berlin.

Until 1969 he worked at the Staatskapelle Halle under Olaf Koch. From 1969 to 1973 he worked as an editor at the Deutscher Verlag für Musik in Leipzig. He was a teacher of the Halle composers class and from 1987 an honorary lecturer at the University of Halle-Wittenberg. Until 1995 he directed the Society of Composers of Saxony-Anhalt and the contemporary music festival Hallische Musiktage. He was also founder and artistic director of the concert series approximation.

In 1979 he composed the Concerto for Two Violins and Orchestra in One Movement as the opening concert at the Handel Festival, Halle. Last lived and worked as a freelance composer in Halle.

== Awards ==
- 1978 Hans Stieber Prize
- 1982 Hanns Eisler Prize

== Selected works ==
Stage

- Weiberkomödie, Opera after Heiner Müller

Orchestra

- Symphony No.1
- Symphony No.2 (1982)
- Kammersinfonie 1 (Chamber Symphony No.1) (1972)
- Kammersinfonie 2 (Chamber Symphony No.2) for 12 solo strings and percussion (1978)
- Mémoire, Music for string orchestra (1986)

Concertante

- Concerto for 2 violins and orchestra (1978–1979)
- Concerto for violin and orchestra (c.1989)
- Concerto for viola and orchestra
- Orpheus for English horn and string orchestra

Chamber music

- Monolog for flute solo (1973)
- String Quartet No.1 (1974)
- Trio Sonata for flute, oboe and bassoon (1978)
- String Quartet No.2 (1980)
- String Sextet for 2 violins, 2 violas and 2 cellos (1980)
- Quattrosonata for flute, clarinet, bassoon and piano (c.1984)
- Orpheus: Fragmente I for 2 guitars
- Orpheus: Fragmente II, In Memoriam Victor Jara for oboe, trombone, viola, cello, guitar, piano and percussion (1985)
- Nachtklang 2, Music for flute (alto flute/piccolo) and percussion (2 players) (c.1994)
- Sotto Voce, Music for alto flute, clarinet and bass clarinet (1995)
- Sonata for violin and piano

Choral

- Assoziationen, Cycle for mixed chorus a cappella (1969–1970); words by Heinz Czechowski and Kurt Bartsch
- Melodramen für Chile for narrator, flute, piano and percussion (1974); words by Viktor Jara und Pablo Neruda
- Invocación: "In Memoriam Paul Dessau" for mixed chorus a cappella (1974); words by Pablo Neruda
- Hölderlin for mixed chorus a cappella (1988); words by Friedrich Hölderlin
- Der Frieden muß halten for children's chorus and piano (1989)
- Rundgesang for mixed chorus and piano (1989)

== Sources ==
- Gerd Domhardt biography at Landesverband Sachsen-Anhalt (in German)
