= Matthias Lorenz =

German cellist

Matthias Lorenz (born 11 June 1964) is a German cellist.

== Life ==
Born in Bensheim, Lorenz studied at the Hochschule für Musik und Darstellende Kunst Frankfurt am Main with Gerhard Mantel and participated in courses given by Siegfried Palm and Wolfgang Boettcher. Since the end of his studies in 1991 he has been working as a freelance cellist, first in Frankfurt.

Already at the beginning of his studies, Lorenz had decided to play mainly contemporary music. This led to numerous premieres and contacts with living composers. His work in the field of contemporary music can be divided into three areas: solo - piano trio - ensemble:

- Lorenz continually plays solo concertos for cello. Since 2007, among other things, he has been involved in the annual project Bach.heute, in which he combines a suite by Johann Sebastian Bach with selected contemporary music. Since 2014 the series Old Masters has followed, in which the focus is on masterpieces from the 1960s, each of which is followed by a world premiere (2015 Jörg Herchet, 2016 Peter Ablinger). Typical for him are concerts in which he comments on the composition of the programmes as well as the individual pieces.
- 2001 Foundation in Dresden of the elole-Klaviertrio.
- Lorenz plays regularly as a guest in various ensembles. Since 2003 he is a member of the Dresden-based "Ensemble courage".

Other genres are constantly being added to this activity: improvised ballet music for the Frankfurt Ballet under Bill Forsythe, Gormenghast with Irmin Schmidt or various radio plays with Albrecht Kunze.

== Discography ==
- Albrecht Kunze: 4 Hörstücke.
- Peter Ruzicka: All works for cello solo, Dabringhaus und Grimm 1994
- Jörg Birkenkötter: Solo, Cavalli Records 2003.
- 2 Trios & 2 Babies, with Oliver Schwerdt, Christian Lillinger, Günter Sommer, Matthias Mainz, Fabian Niermann, Michael Haves among others. Euphorium, 2005.
- Struktur und Oberfläche. Works by Jürg Frey, Stefan Streich, Nikolaus Brass. Beoton, 2010.
- Equal Ways of Difference Works by Charlotte Seither, WERGO, 2015
- Cello Einsatz. Works by Paul-Heinz Dittrich, Jörg Herchet, Klaus Huber, Younghi Pagh-Paan and Ernst Helmuth Flammer, Querstand, 2017
