= Kropstädt =

Village in Saxony-Anhalt, Germany

- Stadtteil of Wittenberg
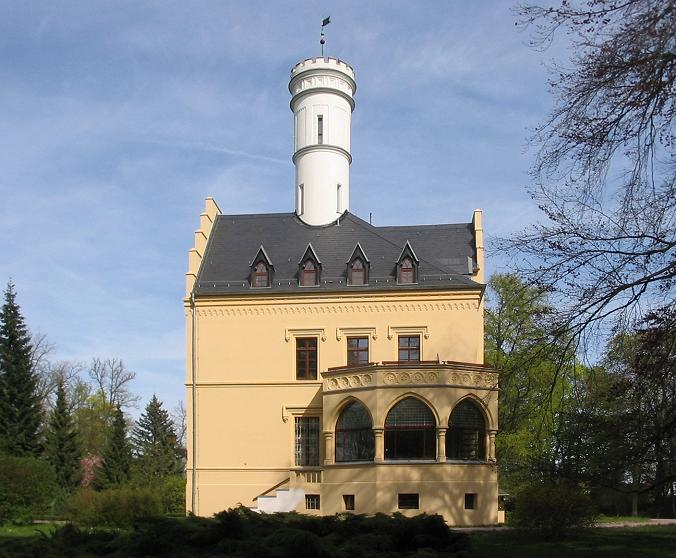
- Interactive map of Kropstädt
- Location within Germany Location within Saxony-Anhalt
- Coordinates: 51°58′N 12°44′E
- Country: Germany
- State: Saxony-Anhalt
- District: Wittenberg
- Town: Wittenberg

Area
  - Total: 32.13 km^{2} (12.41 sq mi)
- Elevation: 107 m (351 ft)

Population (2006-12-31)
  - Total: 1,315
  - Density: 40.93/km^{2} (106.0/sq mi)
- Time zone: UTC+01:00 (CET)
  - Summer (DST): UTC+02:00 (CEST)
- Postal codes: 06895
- Dialling codes: 034920
- Vehicle registration: WB

Kropstädt is a village and a former municipality in Wittenberg district in Saxony-Anhalt, Germany. Since 1 January 2010, it is part of the town Wittenberg.

== Geography ==
Kropstädt lies about 12 km northeast of Lutherstadt Wittenberg in the Fläming and is part of the Fläming Nature Park, which was opened in 2005.

== Economy and transportation ==
Federal Highway (Bundesstraße) B 2 from Wittenberg to Berlin runs right through the community.

== Sights ==
- Castle Kropstädt with garden, built around 1850 on the place of the former water castle Liesnitz, which was built in 1150.

== Personalities ==
- Hans-Eckardt Wenzel, born 31 July 1955 is a German singer-songwriter, musician and lyricist.
