= Thuon Burtevitz =

German composer

Thuon Burtevitz (born 27 August 1973) is a German composer.

== Life ==
Born in Halle (Saale), Burtevitz first studied philosophy at the Technical University of Dresden, then changed to the Hochschule für Musik Carl Maria von Weber as a student of Jörg Herchet. She continued her studies at the Studio für Elektronische Musik and as a master student of Dimitri Terzakis at the Hochschule für Musik und Theater "Felix Mendelssohn Bartholdy" Leipzig. Since then she has been living as a freelance composer in Dresden.

== Work ==
Burtevitz developed her own tuning system for the piano work "Axia" (ancient Greek: "fundamental value") which lasts a good one and a half hours. In this system all intervals have a different size. For example, there are five different fifths. The octaves are also unequal. With this tuning system a strict order of tones is created, which nevertheless remains open to infinity. The form and rhythms of "axia" are also based on the tuning system.

== Awards ==
- Scholarship of the Mozart Foundation, Frankfurt 2004
- Working scholarships of the Kulturstiftung des Freistaates Sachsen 2006 and 2009
- Composition prize of the state capital Stuttgart 2008 für Rabba in Sard… (violin and prepared piano)
