= Martin Schneider (opera director) =

German opera director (1938–2021)

Martin Schneider (5 March 1938 – 22 January 2021) was a German opera director and former Hochschullehrer.

== Life ==
Born in Merseburg, Schneider studied music education, Germanistik and musicology as well as violin, piano and singing at the Martin-Luther-Universität Halle-Wittenberg. His teachers included the musicologist Walther Siegmund-Schultze and the music historian Max Schneider. Schneider completed his studies with a diploma and worked as an editorial assistant at the Rundfunk der DDR. In 1962, Schneider moved to the Komische Oper Berlin as assistant director and Abendspielleiter. From 1970, he became Spielleiter at the Komische Oper Berlin and worked under Walter Felsenstein, Götz Friedrich and Horst Bonnet, among others. From 1974 onwards, Martin Schneider was "1st Spielleiter" of the Opernhaus Halle, of which he became director in 1978. Since 1970, guest productions have taken him to other houses such as the Hans Otto Theater in Potsdam, the Nationale Opera en Ballet Amsterdam and the Staatstheater Cottbus as well as to Deutscher Fernsehfunk.

Since 1980, Schneider has been active as a freelancer, director and university lecturer, including teaching assignments at the University of Music and Theatre Leipzig and at the Berlin University of the Arts. Since 1982, he had worked at the Hochschule für Musik "Hanns Eisler" Berlin, first as Oberassistent and from 1986 as lecturer for "scenic teaching" in the vocal department. From 1992 to 2003, he was professor and "scenic director" of the Music Theatre. From 2003 until 2006, Martin Schneider was lecturer at the Hochschule für Musik "Hanns Eisler" Berlin.

Schneider is Christoph Schneider's father, the drummer of the rock band Rammstein, and by Constanze Schneider, a designer and costume designer. Together with his wife Antje Schneider, he undertook reading tours with literary-musical programmes.

Schneider died at the age of 82.
