= Reiko Füting =

German composer

Reiko Fueting (born 1970 in Königs Wusterhausen) is a German composer living in the United States.

== Life and career ==
Reiko Fueting was born in 1970 in Königs Wusterhausen, East Germany. He studied composition and piano at the Hochschule für Musik Carl Maria von Weber in Dresden before moving to the United States to pursue graduate degrees at Rice University and Manhattan School of Music. Fueting's primary teachers include Jörg Herchet and Nils Vigeland (composition) and Winfried Apel (piano).

Fueting has been a faculty member at Manhattan School of Music since 2000. He teaches composition and has served as chair of the music theory division since 2005. In 2015, New Focus Recordings released names, erased, a full-length album of Fueting's music.

His own students include Alex Burtzos, Christopher Cerrone, and Michael Harrison.

== Compositions ==
=== Solo ===
- names, erased (2014) for cello solo
- wand-uhr - infinite shadows (2013) for guitar solo
- Echo des Lichts (2012) for organ solo
- tanz, tanz (2010) for violin solo
- land - haus - berg (2009) for piano solo
- red wall (2006) for guitar solo
- re-fraction: shadows (2005) for cello solo
- nach-klang: dissolve (2004) for piano solo
- leaving without (2003) for piano solo
- gleichzeitg nacheinander (2001) for piano solo

=== Chamber ===
- leaving without/palimpsest 3 (2014) for clarinet, violin and piano
- ist - Mensch - geworten (2014) for flute and piano
- infinite spring (2009) for guitar, flute, clarinet, viola, and cello
- Kaddish: The Art of Losing (2008) for cello and piano
- leaving without/palimpsest (2006) for piano and clarinet
- re-fraction:shadows/palimpsest 2 (2005) for violin and cello
- nach-klang:dissolve/palimpsest (2004) for flute, bassoon, and piano
- finden - suchen (2002) for alto flute, cello and piano
- light, asleep (2002) for violin and piano
- Es geht ein' dunkle Wolk' herein (1997) for flute and guitar
- Wenn nichts mehr da wäre, wohen man zu gehen hätte, ist das Wiederkommen von Heil (1994) for viola and piano

=== Ensemble ===
- Weg der Schwäne (2015)
- vine: snow (2014)
- leaving without/palimpsest 2 (2007)
- nach-klang:dissolve/palimpsest 2 (2007)

=== Orchestra ===
- stimmen, nachtdurchwaschen (2007)

=== Vocal ===
- mo"nu"ment for C (2015) for baritone, trumpet, trombone, bass clarinet, and string orchestra
- land of silence: waves - bridges (2010) baritone, trumpet, trombone, and bass clarinet
- über zwischen-welten (2006) for baritone, piano, and percussion quartet
- ...gesammeltes Schweigen (2006) for mezzo-soprano solo or with piano
- ...und Ich bin Dein Spiegel (2000) for soprano and string quartet
- ...erst im ershcrockenen Raum (1999) for mezzo-soprano and orchestra
- ...einst wuschen am Grund (1999) for baritone and piano
- ...weil sie in den Gedichten steht (1994) for baritone and cello

=== Choral ===
- in allem frieden (2012)
- ...wie wer klar werden (2012)
- alls ein licht (2011)
- höhen - stufen (2011)
- in allen landen (2010)
- der töne licht (2008)
- ...und wo Du bist (2007)
- ...als aus nacht kimmer wurde (2005)
- weht - umweht (2005)
- atme - erken (2004)
- silently wanders (1999)
