= Staatsschauspiel Dresden =

State drama theatre in Dresden, Saxony, Germany

Coordinates: 51°03′41″N 13°45′04″E

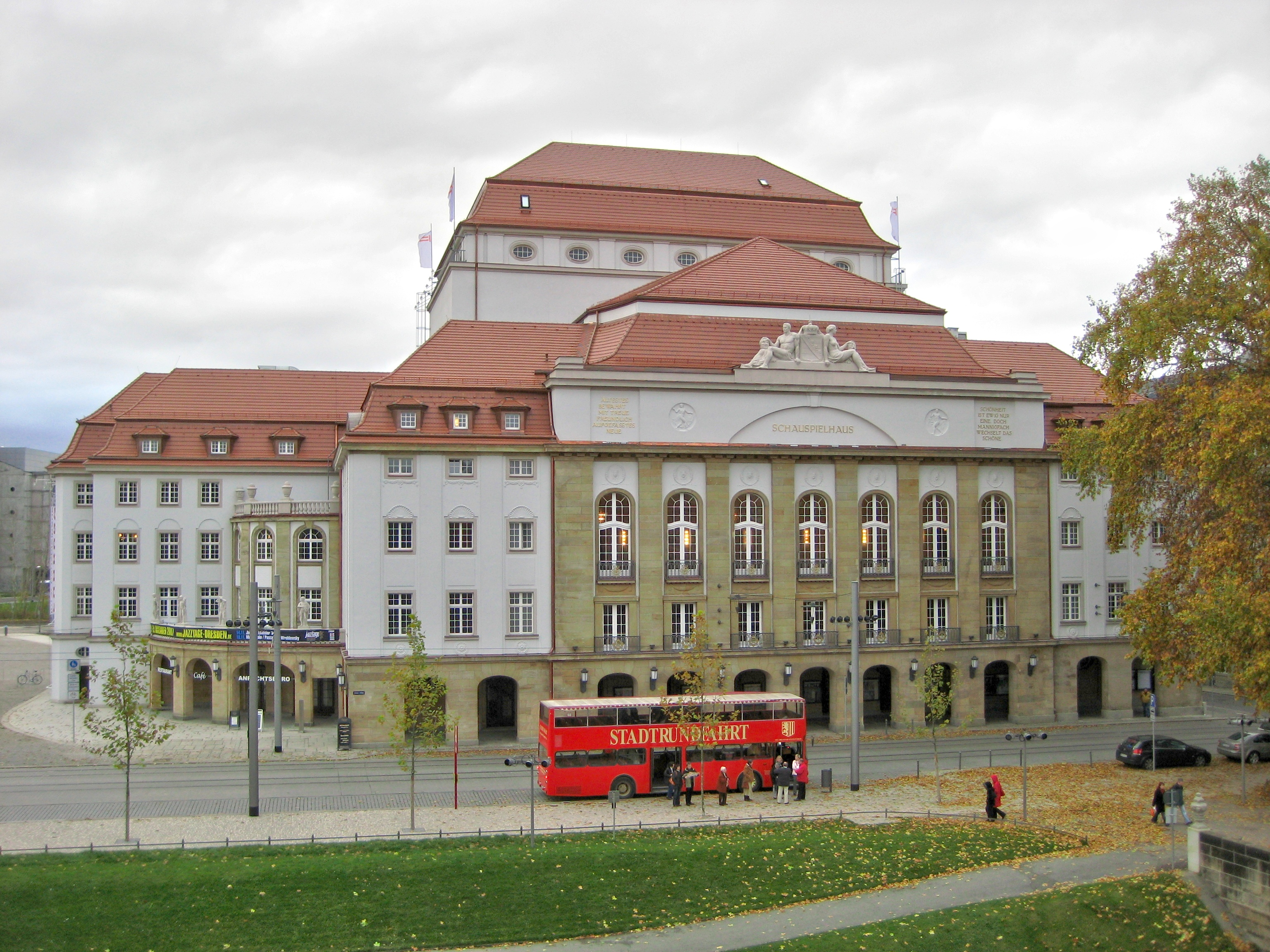
Staatsschauspiel Dresden

The Staatsschauspiel Dresden (State Playhouse Dresden) is a theatre in Dresden. It is maintained by the Free State of Saxony, hence its name. It consists of a main auditorium, the Schauspielhaus (play house), and a studio theatre, the Kleine Haus. It was created in 1983 and housed in the old Staatstheater Dresden which traced back to a Royal Court Theatre.

== Architectural history ==
=== Schauspielhaus ===
The Staatstheater Dresden was built from 1911 to 1913 opposite the Zwinger, to Neo Baroque and Art Nouveau designs by William Lossow and his son Max Hans Kühne and with the support of the industrialist Karl August Lingner. It harmonised with the Zwinger's architecture, with arcades and baroque elements on its exterior. The new theatre's technical facilities, including hydraulically operated machinery for the new sliding scenery by technical director Adolf Linnebach, made it the most advanced theatre of its time.

On 13 and 14 February 1945 the building was partially destroyed in the bombing of Dresden, but was rebuilt and reopened within three years, becoming the first German theatre to reopen post-war.
