= Carsten Hennig =

German footballer

Personal information
- Date of birth: 6 November 1976 (age 49)
- Place of birth: Mainz, West Germany
- Height: 1.77 m (5 ft 10 in)
- Position: Defender

Youth career
- 1. FSV Mainz 05
- VfB Ginsheim

Senior career*
| Years | Team | Apps | (Gls) |
| –1997 | Eintracht Frankfurt II | | |
| 1996–1997 | Eintracht Frankfurt | 3 | (0) |
| 1997–2001 | FSV Frankfurt | 30 | (1) |
| 2001–2002 | VfR Mannheim | 33 | (0) |
| 2002–2007 | FSV Frankfurt | 29 | (0) |
| 2007–2009 | SV Wehen Wiesbaden II | 55 | (0) |
- * Club domestic league appearances and goals

Carsten Hennig (born 6 November 1976) is a German former football player. He made his debut on the professional league level in the 2. Bundesliga for Eintracht Frankfurt on 22 September 1996 when he started in a game against Stuttgarter Kickers.
