= Hallische Musiktage =

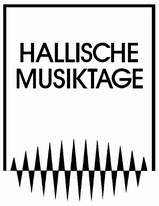
Logo

The Hallische Musiktage are a festival specialised on contemporary music, based in Halle (Saale). Founded in 1955, it is held annually in November, the second-oldest German festival of contemporary music after the Donaueschinger Musiktage.

== Hans Stieber Prize ==
From 1977, the Hans Stieber Prize was given to young composers. It is named after Hans Stieber, a composer born in Naumburg who founded a music school there.

== Artistic directors ==
Artistic directors of the festivals included:

- Ottmar Gerster (1955–1956)
- Ernst Hermann Meyer
- Walther Siegmund-Schultze
- Hans Jürgen Wenzel
- Gerd Domhardt (1989–1994)
- Johannes Reiche (1994–1995)
- Thomas Buchholz (from 1995)

== Venues ==
Festival events have been held at:

- Bartholomäuskirche
- Franckesche Stiftungen
- Handel House
- Kulturinsel Halle
- Kabarett „Die Kiebitzensteiner“
- Ulrichkirche
- Marktkirche Unser Lieben Frauen
- Moritzburg
- Neue Residenz
- Halle Opera House
- Volkspark

== Artists ==
The German and international ensembles and artists haveve included the orchestra of the Halle opera house, Ensemble Konfrontation, Thomas Rothert, the Universal Ensemble Berlin, Waltraut Wächter, the Kiever Kammerakademie, MDR Sinfonieorchester, Howard Arman, Georgisches Kammerorchester, Meißner Kantorei, Orion Ensemble, Hover Chamber Choir, Ensemble Sortisatio, Leipziger Schlagzeugensemble, Rheinisches Bach-Collegium, Forum Zeitgenössischer Musik Leipzig, The Hilliard Ensemble, Elizabeth Bice, Kairos Quartett, National Chamber Orchestra of Armenia and Salzburger Harfenduo.

== Premieres ==
The festival premiered works by composers including:

- Reiner Bredemeyer
- Alan Bush
- Sidney Corbett
- Paul Dessau
- Gerd Domhardt
- Matthew Greenbaum
- Georg Katzer
- Tilo Medek
- Rainer Riehn
- Percy M. Young
- Ruth Zechlin

== Literature ==
- Thomas Buchholz (ed.): Eine Kleine Chronik. LVDK Sachsen-Anhalt, Halle/Saale 2005
