= Jörg Herchet =

German composer (born 1943)

Jörg Herchet (born 20 September 1943) is a German composer.

== Life ==
Born in Dresden, Herchet grew up as the son of a driver and a worker in modest circumstances. As a pupil he received recorder and cello lessons, later piano and singing lessons. Already at that time he composed his first smaller compositions.

From 1962 to 1965 he studied musical composition at the Hochschule für Musik Carl Maria von Weber in Dresden with Johannes Paul Thilman and Manfred Weiss, cello with Clemens Dillner and piano with Ilse Brähmer. The use of a Franz Kafka text in his composition Interfragmentarium zum werke von franz k. für klavier und alt led to distortions with the Hochschule, whereupon Herchet continued his composition studies at the Hochschule für Musik "Hanns Eisler" in East-Berlin with Rudolf Wagner-Régeny from 1967 to 1969. His diploma thesis on The importance of music-theoretical writings by Schönberg and Hindemith for the development of a compositional theory was rejected on the grounds that a compositional theory "must lead to Hanns Eisler and not to Pierre Boulez". He also studied musicology (among others with Georg Knepler) at the Humboldt-Universität zu Berlin.

After Herchet first worked as an assistant in the book trade and received organ lessons from Gerald Stier and Herbert Collum from 1969 to 1970, he became a master student of Paul Dessau from 1970 to 1974. In 1974, Herchet moved back to Dresden and lived there as a freelance composer. With works whose instrumentation Herchet gradually enlarged, he gradually became known. The orchestral composition komposition für flöte und orchester from 1976 was his first great success. His komposition für trombone, bariton und orchester was premiered during the 1980 Donaueschinger Musiktage.

From 1981 he received teaching positions for composition and composition at the Hochschule für Musik "Carl Maria von Weber". In 1992 he was appointed professor for composition and analysis. His students include Thuon Burtevitz, Michael Flade, Reiko Füting, Johannes Korndörfer, Sergej Newski, Tobias Eduard Schick, Bernhard Schneyer, Theodor Schubach, Karoline Schulz, Johannes Voit, and Lydia Weißgerber. Herchet retired in 2009 and now lives in Weinböhla.

== Awards ==
- 1993: Internationaler Bodensee-Kulturpreis für Musik
- Since 1995: Member of the Sächsische Akademie der Künste

== Compositions (selection) ==
- Composition 1 for organ (1981)
- Namen Gottes. Composition 3 for organ (Zyklus; 1990–)
- Das geistliche Jahr. (Kantatenzyklus zum geistlichen Jahr; 1978–)
- Bußkantate Composition for soprano, alto, baritone, choir, harp, percussion and organ (to the text by Jörg Milbradt, 1978), premiered by dedicatee Meißner Kantorei 1961 and Erich Schmidt.
- Composition for flute, oboe, clarinet, horn, bassoon and piano (1978), premiered in Berlin 1979 by the Bläservereinigung Berlin
- Nachtwache. Composition for musical theatre (1987)
- Abraum. Composition for musical theatre (1996/1997). libretto Jörg Milbradt (nach Motiven aus Und Pippa tanzt! by Gerhart Hauptmann), premiered in 1997 in Leipzig, conductor Lothar Zagrosek
- Composition for flute (also alto flute) and orchestra (1976)
- Cantata para la Fiesta de Nuestra Senora de Guadalupe (Cantata for the Our Lady of Guadalupe festival) (2013) text: Jörg Milbradt, after Valeriano, Antonio: Nican Mopohua/Traducción del Nuatl al Castillano por Mario Rojas Sanchez. Puebla 1989. Partially premiered on 2 April 2013 in Puebla (Mexico). World premiere of the complete work on 7 May 2014 in Dresden.

== Discography ==
- CD Komposition 1 für 2 Violinen, Viola und Violoncello. Arditti Quartet. Wergo 1986.
- CD Namen Gottes: Orgelwerke. Gary Verkade. Querstand 2008.
- CD Das geistliche Jahr 1. Vier Kantaten. Meißner Kantorei 1961. Christfried Brödel. Querstand 2012.
- CD Das geistliche Jahr 2. Vier Kantaten. Meißner Kantorei 1961. Christfried Brödel, Elole-Klaviertrio. Querstand 2013.
- CD Das geistliche Jahr 3. Drei Kantaten. Meißner Kantorei 1961. Christfried Brödel; Matthias Geuting. Querstand 2017.
- CD Seligpreisungen. Komposition I für Orgel Stück VIII. Dominik Susteck, Organ. Querstand 2013.

== Bibliography ==
- Christoph Sramek: Die töne haben mich geblendet. Klaus-Jürgen Kamprad publishing house, Altenburg 2003.
- Über Herchet-Aufführungen des Dresdner Kreuzchores, in Matthias Herrmann's Dresdner Kreuzchor und zeitgenössische Chormusik. Ur- und Erstaufführungen zwischen Richter und Kreile, Marburg 2017, p. 144–146, 155–159, 239, 325 (Schriften des Dresdner Kreuzchores, Vol. 2)
- Patrick Beck: Am Fixpunkt der Seele – Gespräch mit Jörg Herchet. In Ostragehege, Zeitschrift für Literatur und Kunst, issue 52, Dresden 2008.
- Felicitas Nicolai: … the fact that I couldn't find a home in the church at all hurt me very much .... Jörg Herchet talking about his cantata cycle "Das geistliche Jahr" dated 22 August 1995. In Matthias Herrmann's Die Dresdner Kirchenmusik im 19. und 20. Jahrhundert. Laaber, Laaber 1998, ISBN 3-89007-331-X. p. 581–596. (Musik in Dresden, 3)
