= Georg Gädker =

German baritone

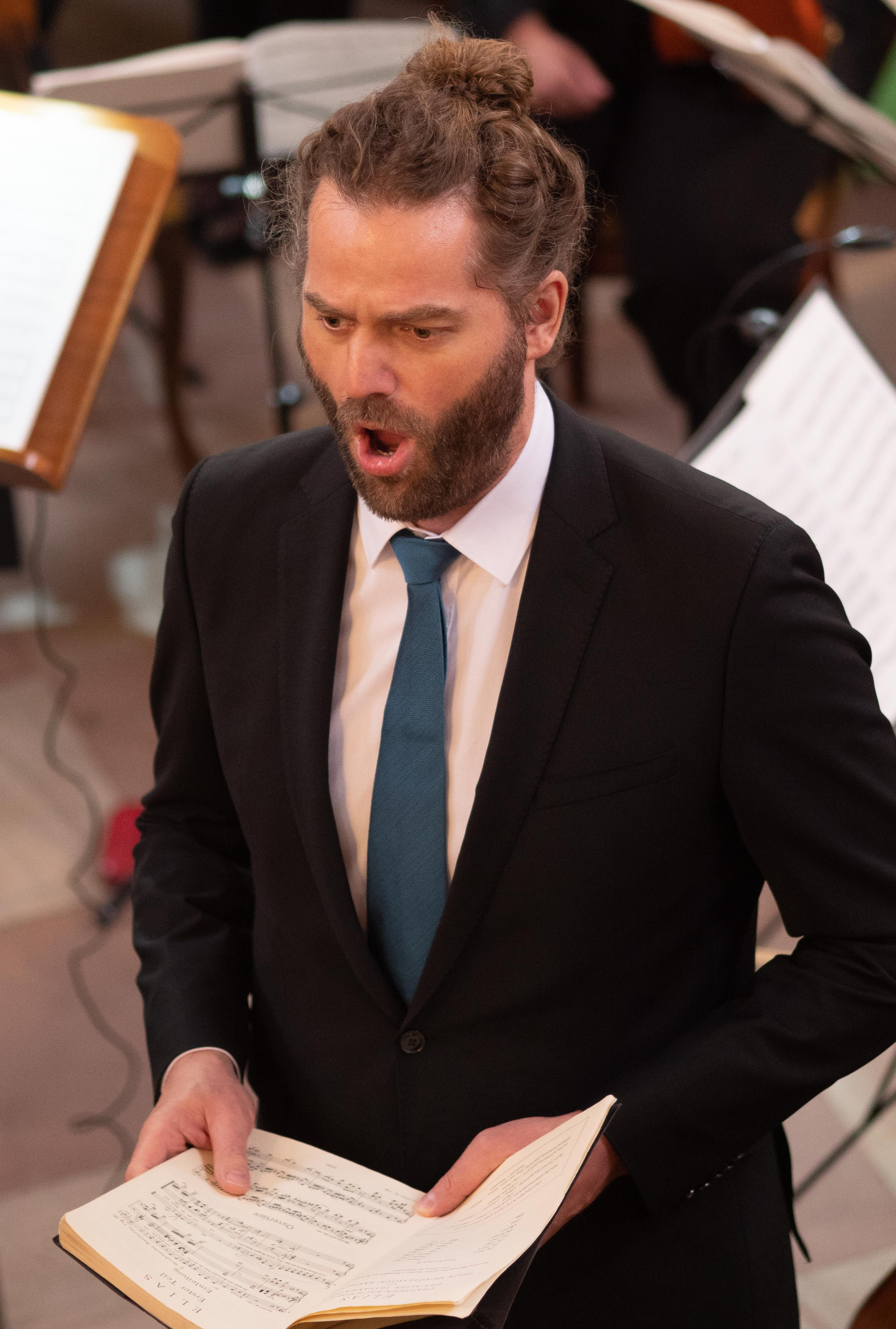
Georg Gädker (2023)

Georg Gädker (born 28 January 1981) is a German operatic and concert baritone.

== Career ==
Gädker was born in Freiburg im Breisgau. As a boy soloist (alto) and young male voice, he sang with the Freiburg Cathedral Boys' Choir and attended the musical high school Kolleg St. Sebastian in Stegen near Freiburg. From 1999 to 2001, he was a young student at the Hochschule für Musik Freiburg under Bernd Göpfert, where he studied singing and vocal pedagogy from 2002. From 2004 to 2009, he continued his studies with Rudolf Piernay at the Hochschule für Musik und Darstellende Kunst Mannheim and at the Guildhall School of Music and Drama of London, where he graduated with distinction. He attended master classes with Margreet Honig, Emma Kirkby, Thomas Quasthoff, Graham Johnson, Sarah Walker, Wolfram Rieger, Charles Spencer and Thomas Hampson. Gädker was a scholarship holder of the Cusanuswerk Studienstiftung.

Gädker has been working freelance since 2009. In concert he appears as an interpreter of most of the great roles in his field, among them, starting from the works of Bach (St Matthew Passion under Reinhard Goebel and with the Tölzer Knabenchor, St John Passion under Helmuth Rilling in Chile, Christmas Oratorio under Hans-Christoph Rademann, Mass in B minor, Ich will den Kreuzstab gerne tragen, BWV 56, various reconstructions of the St Mark Passion, BWV 247, solo cantatas), Handel's Messiah, Jephta and Alexander's Feast, Haydn's The Creation and The Seasons as well as Mozart's Requiem increasingly larger works, such as Beethoven's Symphony No. 9, Mendelssohn's St. Paul and Elijah, Brahms’ Ein deutsches Requiem, César Franck's Les Béatitudes, Williams A Sea Symphony, Orff's Carmina Burana (under Howard Arman), Wagner's Das Liebesmahl der Apostel, Verdi's Messa da Requiem and Britten's War Requiem. Concerts have taken him to concert halls such as the Berliner Philharmonie and the Konzerthaus Berlin, the Muziekgebouw aan 't IJ in Amsterdam, the Kölner Philharmonie, the Gewandhaus in Leipzig, the Tonhalle, Zürich, the Kultur- und Kongresszentrum Liederhalle and the Wigmore Hall in London, in churches like the Berlin Cathedral, the Archbasilica of Saint John Lateran in Rome, the St. Pierre Cathedral in Geneva, Grossmünster in Zürich and the Freiburg Minster, as well as other venues in Europe and worldwide. Radio recordings have been made, including for the NDR, the SWR, deutschlandradio, the BBC and Radio France. A CD with orchestral songs by Gustav Mahler was released in 2010 with the Landesjugendorchester Baden-Württemberg under the direction of Christoph Wyneken.

In the realm of music theatre, Gädker gave guest performances on the stages of Braunschweig, Leipzig, Frankfurt and Mannheim, where he was among others Count Almaviva (The Marriage of Figaro), Aeneas (Dido and Aeneas), Schneck (Der Vogelhändler), Notario (Gianni Schicchi) as well as in other roles in world premieres of the opera Wasser by Arnulf Herrmann and the chamber opera Neumond by Lucia Ronchetti. In 2013 he appeared in the title role of Shostakovich's opera Das Märchen vom Popen und seinem Knecht Balda in a production of the Konzerthaus Berlin and from 2014 he could be heard for two seasons in Shakespeare's The Tempest (direction Calixto Bieito, music by Henry Purcell) at the Mannheim National Theatre. In the 2014/2015 season, Gädker performed in an opera pastichecio after Wilde's The Canterville Ghost with music by Rameau, Purcell and others at the Musiktheater im Revier (MiR) Gelsenkirchen. In 2015 Gädker debuted at the Festival StadtOper Soest in the title role of Mozart's Don Giovanni, followed by the German premiere of Luke Bedford's chamber opera Through his Teeth with the Opera Factory Freiburg in 2016 as well as Hans Zenders Don Quijote de la Mancha at Frankfurt LAB with the Ensemble Modern conducted by Johannes Kalitzke. In 2017 Gädker could be heard in a scenic production of Handel's Jephta at the Landestheater Detmold.

In 2011 Gädker founded the international song recital series "klangwerk LIED" Freiburg together with the soprano Katharina Persicke and the pianist Nicholas Rimmer. Together with Persicke and Rimmer he is the artistic director of this series, which was under the patronage of the American song accompanist's Irwin Gage until his death in 2018.

== Prizes and awards ==
- 2007: Scholarship of the Deutscher Musikwettbewerb at the German Music Competition Berlin and admission to the 52nd Bundesauswahl Konzerte Junger Künstler (BAKJK)
- 2007: 3rd prize specializing in concert at the "Cantilena Singing Competition" of the Jungen Musikerstiftung Bayreuth
- 2008: Scholarship of the International Association of Wagner Societies, Ortsgruppe Mannheim-Kurpfalz
- 2008: 2nd prize at the "Podium Junger GesangsSolisten" of the Verband Deutscher Konzertchöre, Kassel
- 2009: 3rd prize of the International Johannes Brahms Competition, Pörtschach (Austria)
- 2010: 2nd prize at the Internationalen Concorso di Musica Sacra, Rome (Italian)
- 2011: Prizewinner at the International Singing Competition Kammeroper Schloss Rheinsberg
- 2011: Special prize for concert engagement at the Queen Elisabeth Competition, Brüssels
- 2012: 2nd prize at the Robert Schumann International Competition for Pianists and Singers, Zwickau
- 2013: Special prize at the Internationaler Schubert-Wettbewerb Dortmund.
