= Five Esquisses =

Five piano pieces by Jean Sibelius (1929)

- Piano solos by Jean Sibelius
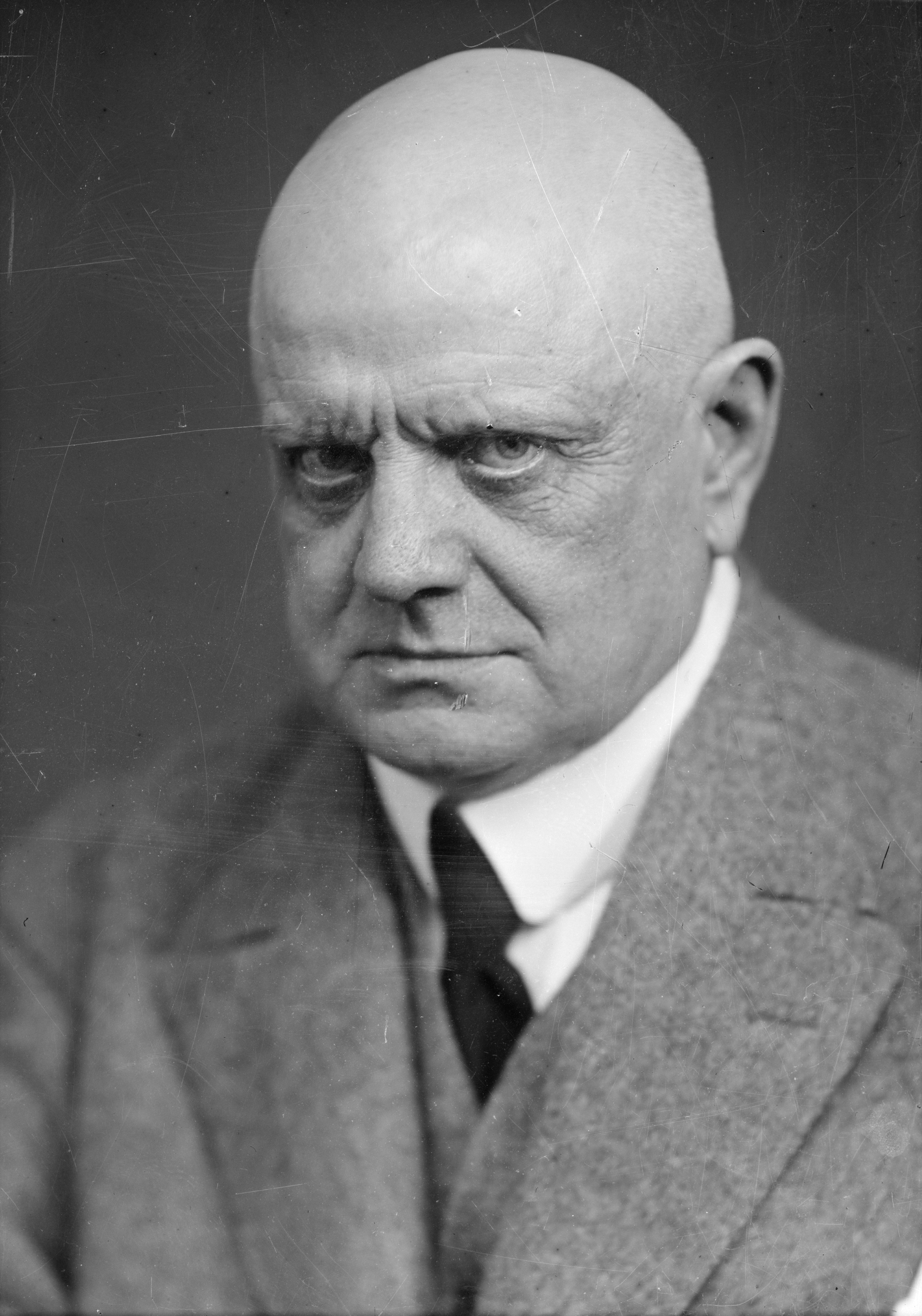
- The composer (c. 1927)
- Opus: 114
- Composed: 1929
- Publisher: Fazer (1973–74)
- Duration: 10 mins

The Five Esquisses (in Finnish: Viisi luonnosta; in German: Fünf Skizzen), Op. 114, is a collection of compositions for piano written in February 1929 by the Finnish composer Jean Sibelius. The Five Esquisses represent—along with the Suite for Violin and String Orchestra in D minor (JS 185), as well as the Op. 115 and Op. 116 seven duos for violin and piano—the dawn of a "radical new stylistic period" for Sibelius. Indeed, these compositions could provide the best clues as to the "sound world" Sibelius's never-realized (and likely destroyed) Symphony No. 8 may have inhabited.

== History ==
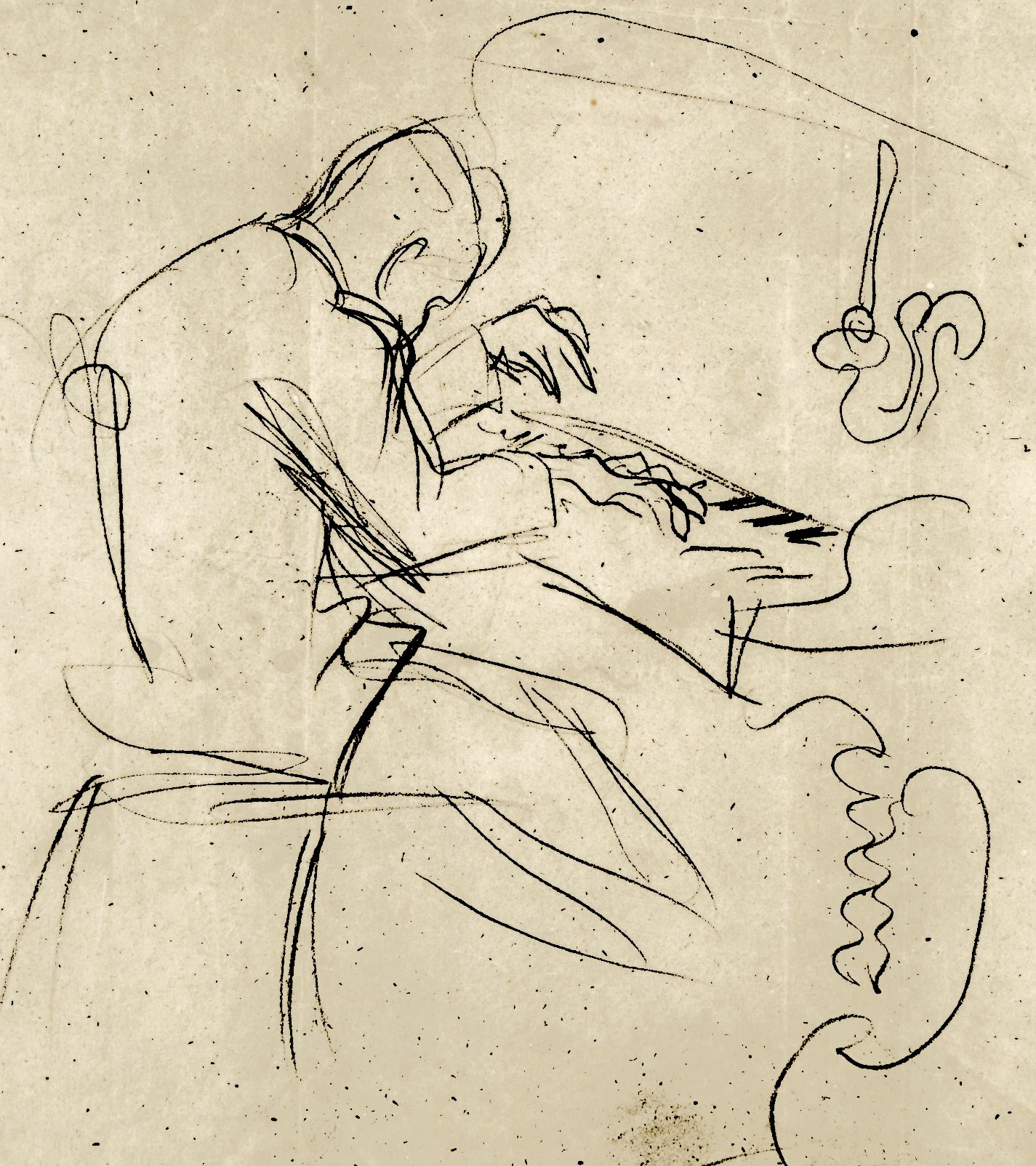
An 1892 sketch of Sibelius at the piano by his future brother-in-law Eero Järnefelt

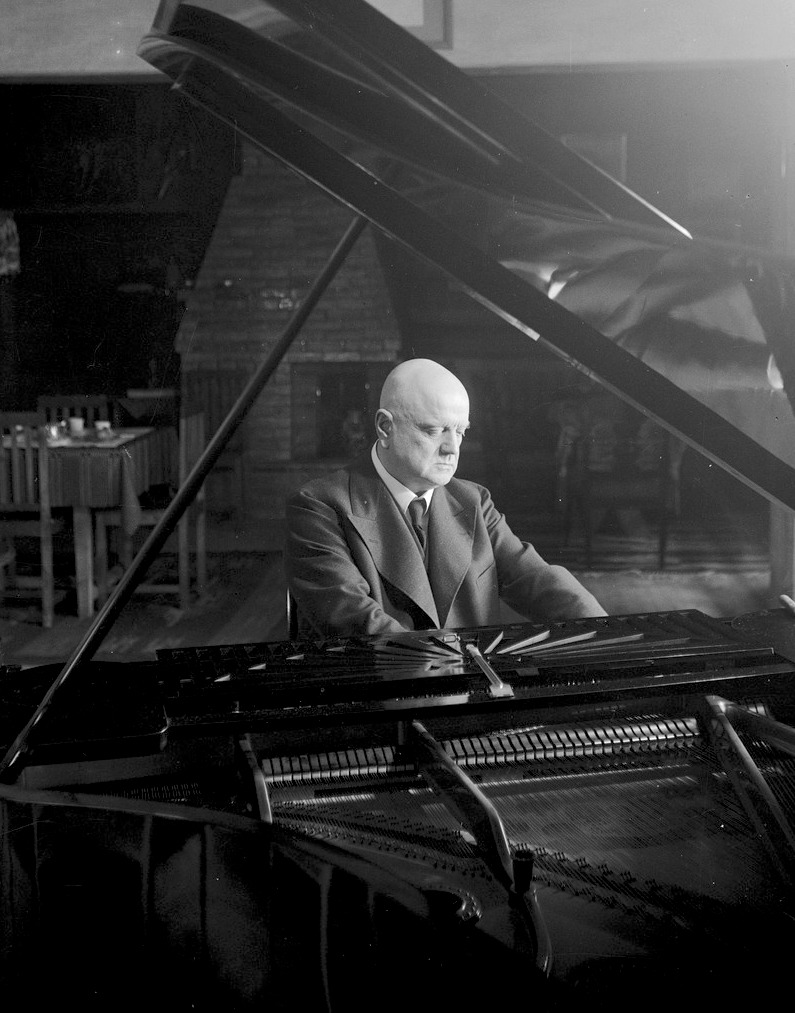
Sibelius (1927) plays the Steinway grand piano at his home, Ainola.

The Five Esquisses have a tortuous publication history. On 5 October 1928, the New York-based publisher Carl Fischer expressing an interest in publishing "works for piano, voice and piano, and violin and piano ..." Sibelius responded to Fischer on 15 February 1929 that it was his "pleasure" to offer four collections of his latest miniatures: the Op. 114 Five Esquisses, as well as the Op. 115 Four Pieces for violin and piano, the Op. 116 Three Pieces for violin and piano, and the Op. 117 (later demoted from Sibelius's opus list) Suite for Violin and String Orchestra. However, Fischer rejected all four compositions:

We must reluctantly inform you that in view of the extremely unfortunate constellation in the music publishing field in the United States, it seems to us inadvisable at the present time to publish compositions of the high standard which you have submitted to us. The market is very unfavorable for this class of music and we are compelled to return them to you with our regrets.

— Carl Fischer Music, in a 7 September 1929 letter to Sibelius

Shortly thereafter, Sibelius sent the pieces to Leipzig's Breitkopf & Härtel, and although they accepted the offer, Sibelius requested the manuscripts be returned to him so that he could revise Metsälaulu; after making the changes, however, he never mailed them back to Germany—likely due to the ever-worsening self-criticism that marred his later career. In 1945, the Helsinki-based published R. E. Westerlund inquired about the Five Esquisses: as with fifteen years prior, Sibelius initially agreed but changed his mind when preparing the manuscripts for publication. Westerlund's second attempt in 1950 was similarly unsuccessful. In the end, the pieces were published posthumously from 1973 to 1974 by Fazer Music.

== Structure and music ==
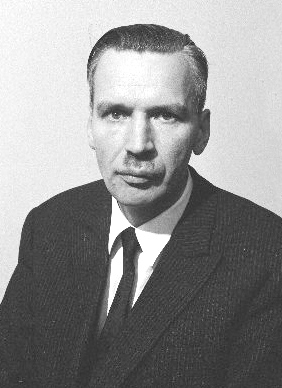
Erik Tawaststjerna, who authored seminal biography on Sibelius, was an early, vocal advocate for many of the composer's piano pieces.

=== No. 1: Landscape ===
Landscape (in Finnish: Maisema) is marked Andantino.

=== No. 2: Winter Scene ===
Winter Scene (in Finnish: Talvikuva) is marked Allegretto.

=== No. 3: Forest Lake ===
Forest Lake (in Finnish: Metsälampi) is marked Con moto.

=== No. 4: Song in the Forest ===
Song in the Forest (in Finnish: Metsälaulu) is marked Animato.

=== No. 5: Spring Vision ===
Spring Vision (in Finnish: Kevätnäky) is without tempo marking.

== Discography ==
External audio
- Performed by Leif Ove Andsnes
- No. 1, Landscape
- No. 2, Winter Scene
- No. 3, Forest Lake
- No. 4, Song in the Forest
- No. 5, Spring Vision

The Finnish pianist Liisa Karhilo made the world premiere studio recording of the Five Esquisses c. 1976 for the Musical Heritage Society. The sortable table below lists this and other commercially available recordings:

No.	Pianist	Runtimes (Note: All runtimes are official, as printed on CD or LP liner notes.)						Rec. (Note: Refers to the year in which the performers recorded the work; this may not be the same as the year in which the recording was first released to the general public.)	Recording venue	Label	Ref.
No.	Pianist	Op. 114/1	Op. 114/2	Op. 114/3	Op. 114/4	Op. 114/5	Total	Rec.	Recording venue	Label	Ref.
1	Liisa Karhilo							c. 1976		Musical Heritage Society	(Note: L. Karhilo–Musical Heritage (MHS 3596) 1976)
2	Tapani Valsta	3:24	2:48	2:11	3:17	1:22	13:02	1975		Finlandia	(Note: T. Valsta–Finlandia (FACD 811) 1991)
3	Erik T. Tawaststjerna	2:34	2:16	1:37	2:22	1:34	10:40	1984	Studio BIS, Djursholm	BIS	(Note: E. Tawaststjerna–BIS (CD–278) 1987)
4	Izumi Tateno	2:15	2:04	1:06	1:39	1:35	8:39	1994	Ainola	Canyon Classics	(Note: I. Tateno–Canyon Classics (PCCL–00243) 1994)
5	Annette Servadei	2:28	2:26	2:25	2:39	1:37	11:32	1994	St George's Church, Brandon Hill	Olympia	(Note: A. Servadei–Olympia (OCD 635) 1997)
6	Ralf Gothoni	1:57	2:10	2:03	2:06	2:25	10:34	1995	Järvenpää Hall	Ondine	(Note: R. Gothóni–Ondine (ODE 847–2) 1995)
7	Eero Heinonen	2:52	2:07	1:32	2:23	1:33	10:27	1999	YLE M2 Studio, Helsinki	Finlandia	(Note: E. Heinonen–Finlandia (8573–80776–2) 2000)
8	Kyoko Tabe	2:24	2:18	1:38	2:04	1:57	10:29	1999	New Broadcasting House, Manchester	Chandos	(Note: K. Tabe–Chandos (CHAN 9833) 2000)
9	Katriina Korte	2:23	2:07	1:26	1:46	1:24	9:09	2001	Järvenpää Hall	Alba	(Note: K. Korte–Alba (ABCA 159) 2001)
10	Håvard Gimse	2:21	2:58	1:23	2:16	1:44	10:44	2001	St Martin's Church, East Woodhay	Naxos	(Note: H. Gimse–Naxos (8.555853) 2004)
11	Kikuo Watanabe	2:18	2:12	1:36	1:47	1:55	9:48	2003	Tokyo Bunka Kaikan	Exton	(Note: K. Watanabe–Exton (OVCX–00009) 2004)
12	Vladimir Ashkenazy	2:24	2:03	1:16	1:54	1:31	9:08	2007	Järvenpää Hall	Exton	(Note: V. Ashkenazy–Exton (EXCL–00017) 2008)
13	Tuija Hakkila	2:36	2:00	1:26	1:44	1:42	9:28	2008	Nya Paviljongen	Alba	(Note: T. Hakkila–Alba (ABCD 297) 2010)
14	Folke Gräsbeck	2:35	2:28	1:27	2:46	1:53	11:25	2009	Kuusankoski Hall	BIS	(Note: F. Gräsbeck–BIS (CD–1927/29) 2010)
15	Rudi Spring	2:45	1:51	1:36	1:52	1:47	9:51	2009	Sounddesign Peter Guschelbauer, Hagenberg	Alessa	(Note: R. Spring–Alessa (ALC 2001) 2010)
16	Joseph Tong	2:24	2:22	1:23	2:05	1:37	9:51	2014	Jacqueline Du Pré Music Building	Quartz	(Note: J. Tong–Quartz (QTZ 2111) 2015)
17	Janne Mertanen	2:09	2:24	1:54	1:57	2:13	10:37	2015	[Unknown], Helsinki	Sony Classical	(Note: J. Mertanen–Sony Classics (888751614222) 2015)
18	Leif Ove Andsnes	1:48	1:55	1:40	1:49	2:05	9:17	2016	Teldex Studio	Sony Classical	(Note: L. Andsnes–Sony Classics (886446267067) 2017)
19	Yi Zhong	2:53	2:19	2:16	2:34	2:00	12:02	2023	[unknown]	TYXArt	(Note: Y. Zhong–TYXArt (TXA24187) 2023)

== Notes, references, and sources ==
Notes

Sources

- Barnett, Andrew (2007). Sibelius. New Haven, Connecticut: Yale University Press. ISBN 978-0-300-16397-1.
- Dahlström, Fabian [in Swedish] (2003). Jean Sibelius: Thematisch-bibliographisches Verzeichnis seiner Werke [Jean Sibelius: A Thematic Bibliographic Index of His Works] (in German). Wiesbaden: Breitkopf & Härtel. ISBN 3-7651-0333-0.
