= Tianwa Yang =

Chinese violinist

- 杨天娲
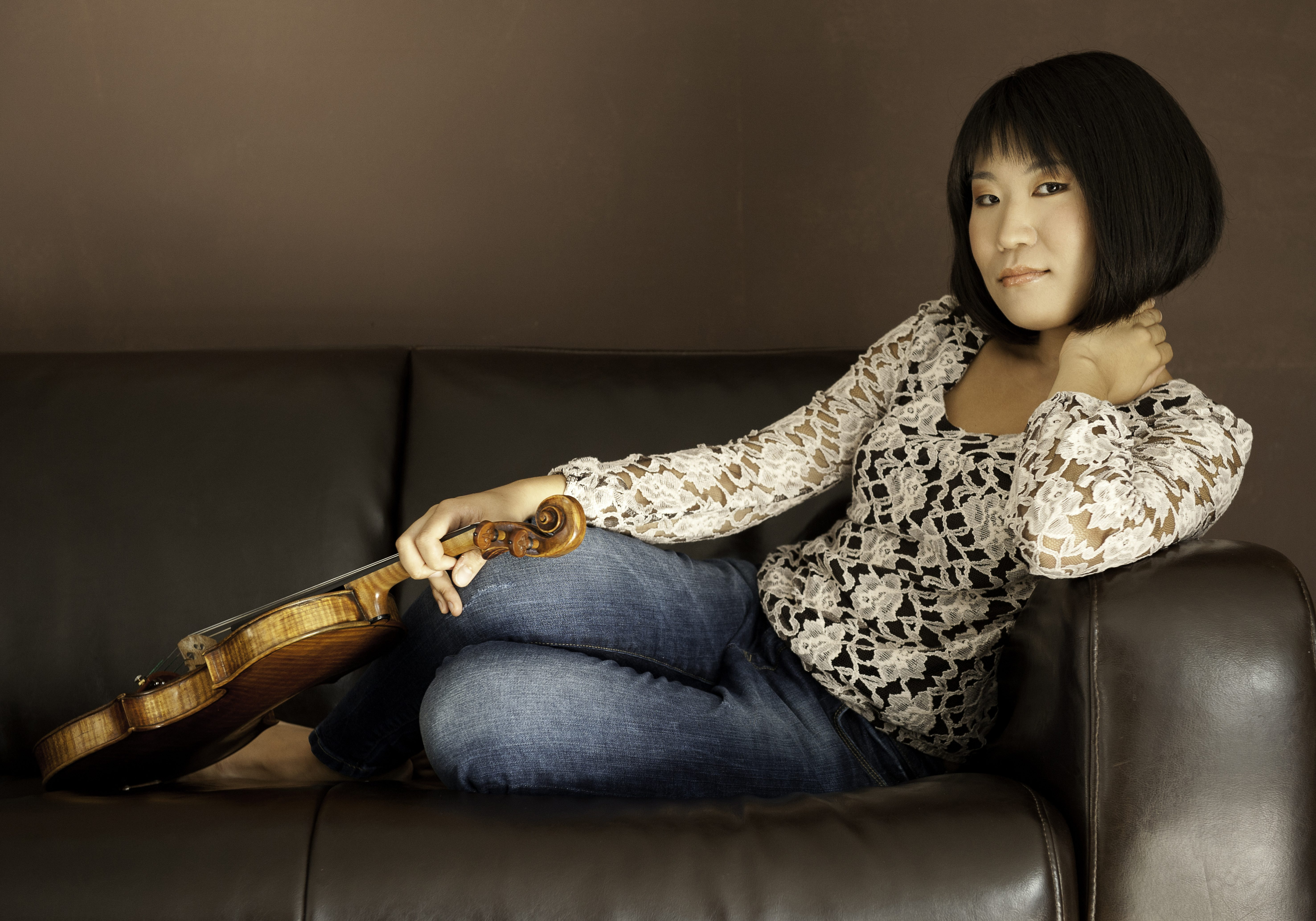
- Born: 8 April 1987 (age 39)
- Occupation: Classical violinist

Tianwa Yang (simplified Chinese: 杨天娲; traditional Chinese: 楊天媧; pinyin: Yáng Tianwa, born 8 April 1987) is a Chinese classical violinist.

== Biography and career ==
Tianwa Yang began learning to play the violin at age four and quickly began winning violin competitions. At age ten, she began studying with Professor Lin Yaoji at the Central Conservatory of Music in Beijing, and already was receiving media attention for the quality of her playing. After she performed at the 1999 Beijing Music Festival, violinist Isaac Stern invited her to play with him in the United States.

Yang debuted in Europe in 2001, performing with the Czech Broadcasting Symphony Orchestra in Prague. In 2003, she performed Prokofiev’s Concerto No. 2 in Munich with the Orchestra of the Bayerische Staatsoper, and followed this with recitals in Paris, Stockholm, Frankfurt and Vienna. Also in 2003, Yang was awarded a special two-year scholarship by the German Academic Exchange Service (DAAD) to study chamber music in Germany. Yang's North American debut was in the 2007–2008 season when she performed at the Virginia Arts Festival with the Virginia Symphony. She also had her debut performance at Berlin Philharmonic Hall, that same year, which was broadcast live by Deutschland Radio. She gave recitals in Switzerland and France and carried out an extensive tour of Germany with Klassische Philharmonie Bonn.

Yang recorded her first CD in 2000, at the age of 13, with a recording of Paganini's 24 Caprices, on the Hugo Classical label. In 2004, she began recording for Naxos, starting a series of the complete works of Pablo de Sarasate, which will eventually cover 8 CDs. She has also recorded works by Piazzolla and Vivaldi.

Since 2018, Yang is violin professor at the Hochschule für Musik Würzburg. She premiered the Jupiter-Etüde by Jörg Widmann at the Mozart Festival Würzburg in 2026, where she was artiste étoile.

Yang plays a Guarneri del Gesu violin from 1730 on loan of the Rin Kei Mei Collection in Singapur.

== Awards ==
- 2015: Echo Klassik, Instrumentalist of the Year
- 2022: Opus Klassik, Instrumentalist of the Year
