= Michał Białk =

Polish classical pianist

Michał Białk (born 4 March 1982 Kraków, Poland) is a Polish classical pianist.

Białk began piano lessons at the age of five, and enrolled in the National Ignacy Jan Paderewski Music School in Kraków two years later. He studied in Freiburg im Breisgau, Paris, Amsterdam, Rostock and Vienna. His major teachers include Elza Kolodin, Matthias Kirschnereit and Oleg Maisenberg. Since its debut at the Krakow Philharmonic, he won prizes at international piano competitions in France, Italy, Spain, Poland and Turkey. Michał Białk gives concerts throughout the world, including Musikverein in Vienna, Stadtcasino in Basel, Festspielhaus Baden-Baden, Vienna State Opera, Hamburg Opera, Konserthuset Stockholm, Salle Cortot in Paris.

== Recordings ==
- Fryderyk Chopin, Michał Białk plays Chopin, 2002
- Ludwig van Beethoven, Sergei Prokofiev Sonatas, 2006
- Fryderyk Chopin, Nocturnes, 2008
