= Suite for Violin and String Orchestra =

Concertante suite by Jean Sibelius

- Concertante piece by Jean Sibelius
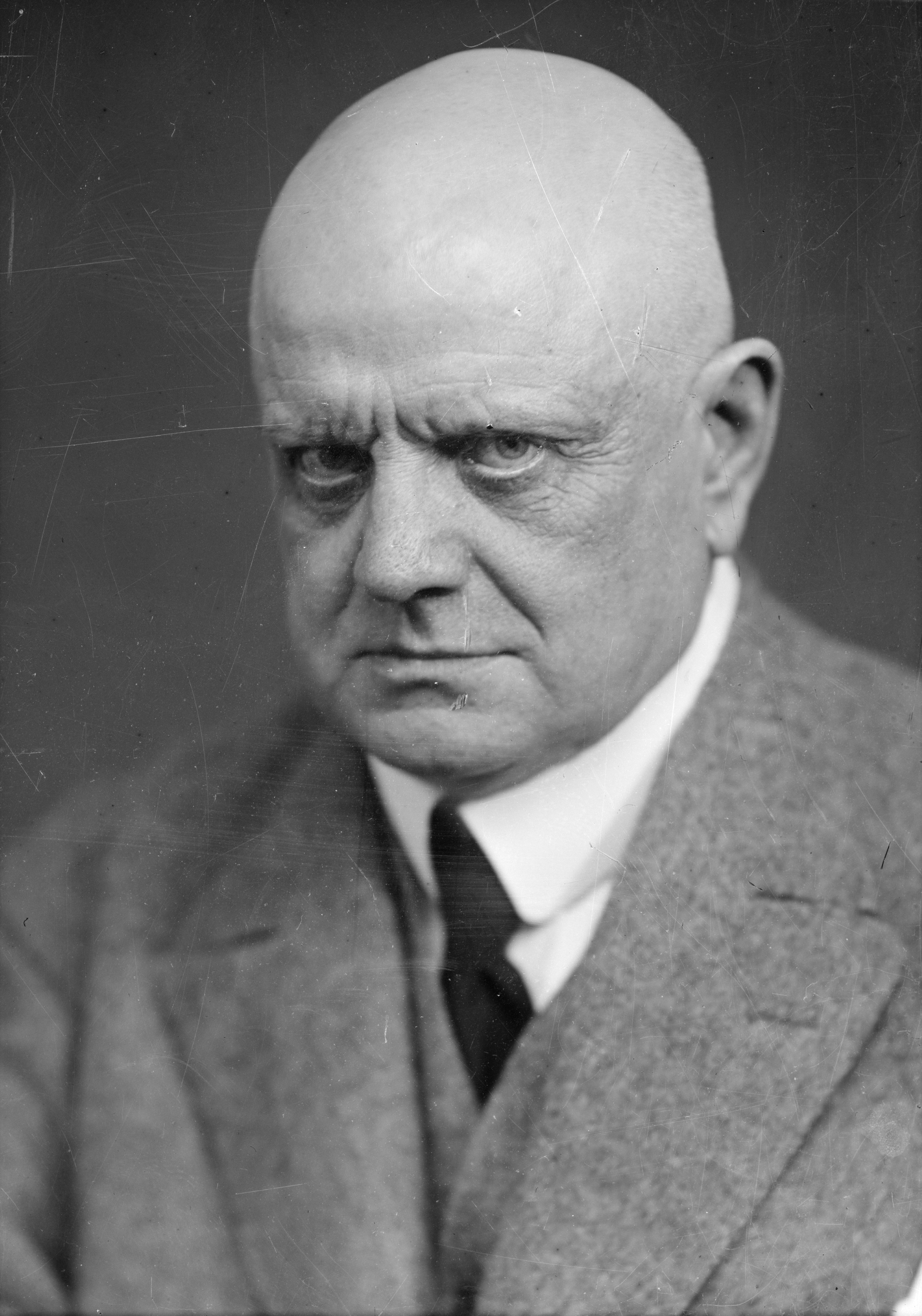
- The composer (c. 1927)
- Catalogue: JS 185 (~~Op. 117~~) (Note: The Suite for Violin and Orchestra is sometimes designated as Sibelius's de facto Op. 117. However, Sibelius's final opus list from 1952 did not assign Op. 117 to any composition. In addition to the Suite, several other compositions at one point provisionally held this designation, including Andante festivo (JS 34; 1922, arranged for strings and timpani in 1938), the Academic March (Promootiomarssi; JS 155, 1919), and the choral piece for male choir and piano Karelia's Fate (Karjalan osa; JS 108, 1930).)
- Composed: 1929
- Publisher: Fazer Music (1994)
- Duration: 7 mins

Premiere
- Date: 8 December 1990
- Location: Lahti, Finland
- Conductor: Osmo Vänskä
- Performers: Lahti Symphony Orchestra; John Storgårds (violin)

The Suite for Violin and String Orchestra, JS 185 (~~Op. 117~~), is a concertante composition for violin and strings written in 1929 by the Finnish composer Jean Sibelius. The piece is in three movements, as follows:

1. Country Scenery. Allegretto
2. Serenade: Evening in Spring. Andantino
3. In the Summer. Vivace

The individual movements bear English language titles, (Note: A recording of the Suite by Deutsche Grammophon provides the following Finnish titles: I. Maalaismaisema, II. Kevätilta; and III. Kesällä.) as Sibelius intended to sell the Suite to the New York-based publisher Carl Fischer.

Fischer wrote to Sibelius on 5 October 1928: "However, we would be much more interested in works for piano, voice and piano, and violin and piano ... If we are permitted to make the suggestion, we would like to recommend that you write some characteristic numbers in the form of an orchestra suite ... We have every reason to believe that an orchestral suite from your pen ... would be a very commercial proposition".

Sibelius wrote back to Fischer on 15 February 1929: "I take pleasure in handing to you herewith the following compositions: Op. 114 Piano-solo .../ Op. 115 Violin-solo with piano .../ Op. 116 Violin-solo with piano .../ Op. 117 [JS 185] Suite for Violin-solo with accomp. of strings".

Fischer responded to Sibelius on 7 September 1929: "We must reluctantly inform you that in view of the extremely unfortunate constellation in the music publishing field in the United States, it seems to us inadvisable at the present time to publish compositions of the high standard which you have submitted to us. The market is very unfavorable for this class of music and we are compelled to return them to you with our regrets".

As a result of Fischer's rejection, Sibelius wrote on the manuscript, "Sketch. To be reworked!" (Note: The original Swedish is: "Skizz. Omarbetas!".)—although he never completed a revision.

The Suite was never performed in Sibelius's lifetime. It received its world premiere in Lahti, Finland on 8 December 1990, the composer's sesquicentennial; the Finnish conductor Osmo Vänskä conducted the Lahti Symphony Orchestra, with the Finnish violinist John Storgårds as soloist.

== Recordings ==
The Finnish conductor Osmo Vänskä and the Lahti Symphony Orchestra made the world premiere studio recording in April 1992 for BIS Records; the soloist was South Korean violinist Dong-Suk Kang. The sortable table below lists commercially available recordings of the Suite:

No.	Conductor	Orchestra	Soloist	Rec. (Note: Refers to the year in which the performers recorded the work; this may not be the same as the year in which the recording was first released to the general public.)	Time	Recording venue	Label	Ref.
1	Osmo Vänskä	Lahti Symphony Orchestra	Dong-Suk Kang	1992	6:52	Ristinkirkko	BIS	(Note: O. Vänskä–BIS (CD–1125) 2000)
2	Juha Kangas	Ostrobothnian Chamber Orchestra	Jari Valo	1994	7:56	Kaustinen Church	Finlandia	(Note: J. Kangas–Finlandia (4509–98995–2) 1996)
3	Thomas Dausgaard	Danish National Symphony Orchestra	Christian Tetzlaff	2002	7:34	Danish Radio Concert Hall (old)	Virgin Classics	(Note: T. Dausgaard–Virgin Classics (7243 5 45534 2 4) 2002)
4	Pekka Kuusisto	Tapiola Sinfonietta	Pekka Kuusisto	2006	8:21	Tapiola Hall, Espoo Cultural Centre	Ondine	(Note: P. Kuusisto–Ondine (ODE 1074–5) 2006)
5	Alejandro Garrido Porras	Orquestra Vigo 430	Nicolas Dautricourt	2014	8:10	Martín Códax Auditorium, Vigo Conservatory of Music	La Dolce Volta	(Note: A. Garrido Porras–La Dolce Volta (LDV 23) 2015)
6	Vladimir Ashkenazy	Philharmonia Orchestra	Esther Yoo	2014	7:53	Fairfield Halls	Deutsche Grammophon	(Note: V. Ashkenazy–DG (481 215 7) 2015)
7	Johannes Klumpp	Folkwang Kammerorchester Essen	Kathrin ten Hagen	2014	8:54	Immanuelskirche, Wuppertal	ARS Produktion	(Note: J. Klumpp–ARS (ARS38157) 2014)
8	Edward Gardner	Bergen Philharmonic Orchestra	James Ehnes	2023	7:57	Grieg Hall	Chandos	(Note: E. Gardner–Chandos (CHAN 5267) 2024)
9	Valentin Egel	Rundfunk-Sinfonieorchester Berlin	Sueye Park	2024	8:51	Haus des Rundfunks, Saal 1, Berlin, Germany	BIS	(Note: V. Egel–BIS (BIS 2782) 2026)

== Notes, references, and sources ==
Notes

Sources

- Barnett, Andrew (2007). Sibelius. New Haven: Yale University Press. ISBN 978-0-300-11159-0.
- Dahlström, Fabian [in Swedish] (2003). Jean Sibelius: Thematisch-bibliographisches Verzeichnis seiner Werke [Jean Sibelius: A Thematic Bibliographic Index of His Works] (in German). Wiesbaden: Breitkopf & Härtel. ISBN 3-7651-0333-0.
