= Esquisses =

Esquisse is a French word meaning "sketch". It has been used as the title of several musical compositions:

- Esquisses (1861), piano pieces by Charles-Valentin Alkan
- La mer, trois esquisses symphoniques pour orchestre (1905), orchestral composition by Claude Debussy
- Esquisses Byzantines (1914–19), 10 pieces for organ by Henri Mulet
- Five Esquisses (1929), piano pieces by Jean Sibelius
- Esquisses, op 41 (1945), organ works by Marcel Dupré
- Sept haïkaï — esquisses japonaises (1966), by Olivier Messiaen
- Messagesquisse (1976), for cellos by Pierre Boulez
- Petites Esquisses d'oiseaux (1985), by Olivier Messiaen
