= Wyneken =

Wyneken is a surname. Notable people with the surname include

- Christoph Wyneken (born 1941), German violinist and conductor
- F. C. D. Wyneken (1810–1876), German-born missionary to America
- Gustav Wyneken (1875–1964), German pedagogue and pederast
