= Philharmonisches Orchester Freiburg =

German symphonic orchestra

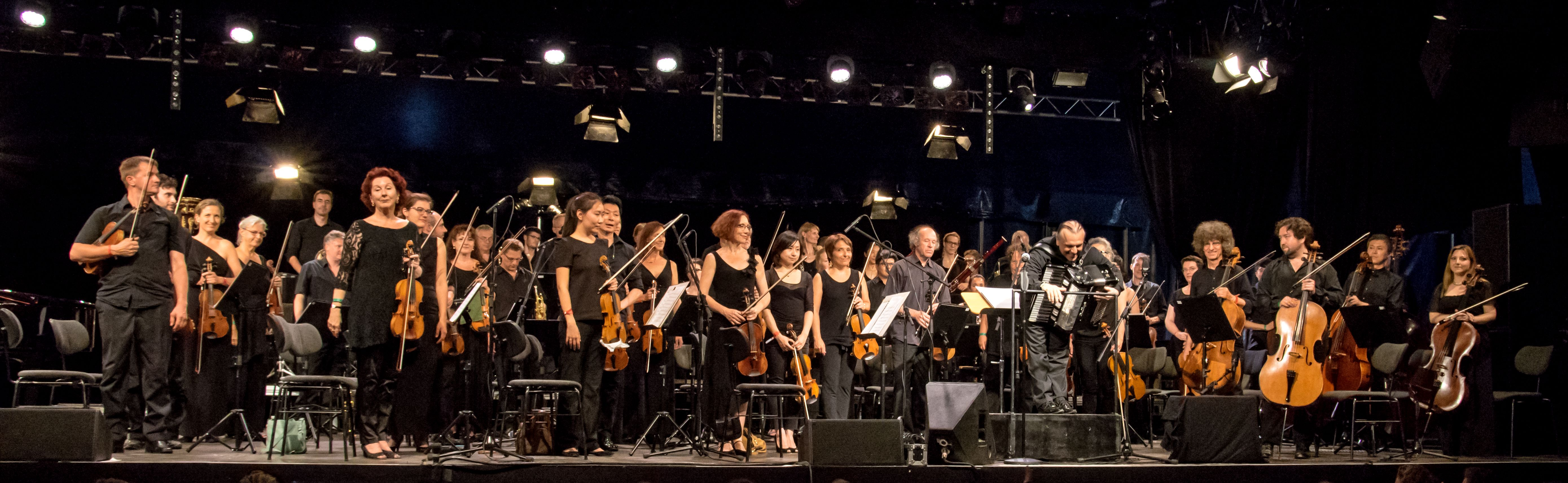
Philharmonisches Orchester Freiburg conducted by Enrique Ugarte for the ZMF in 2016

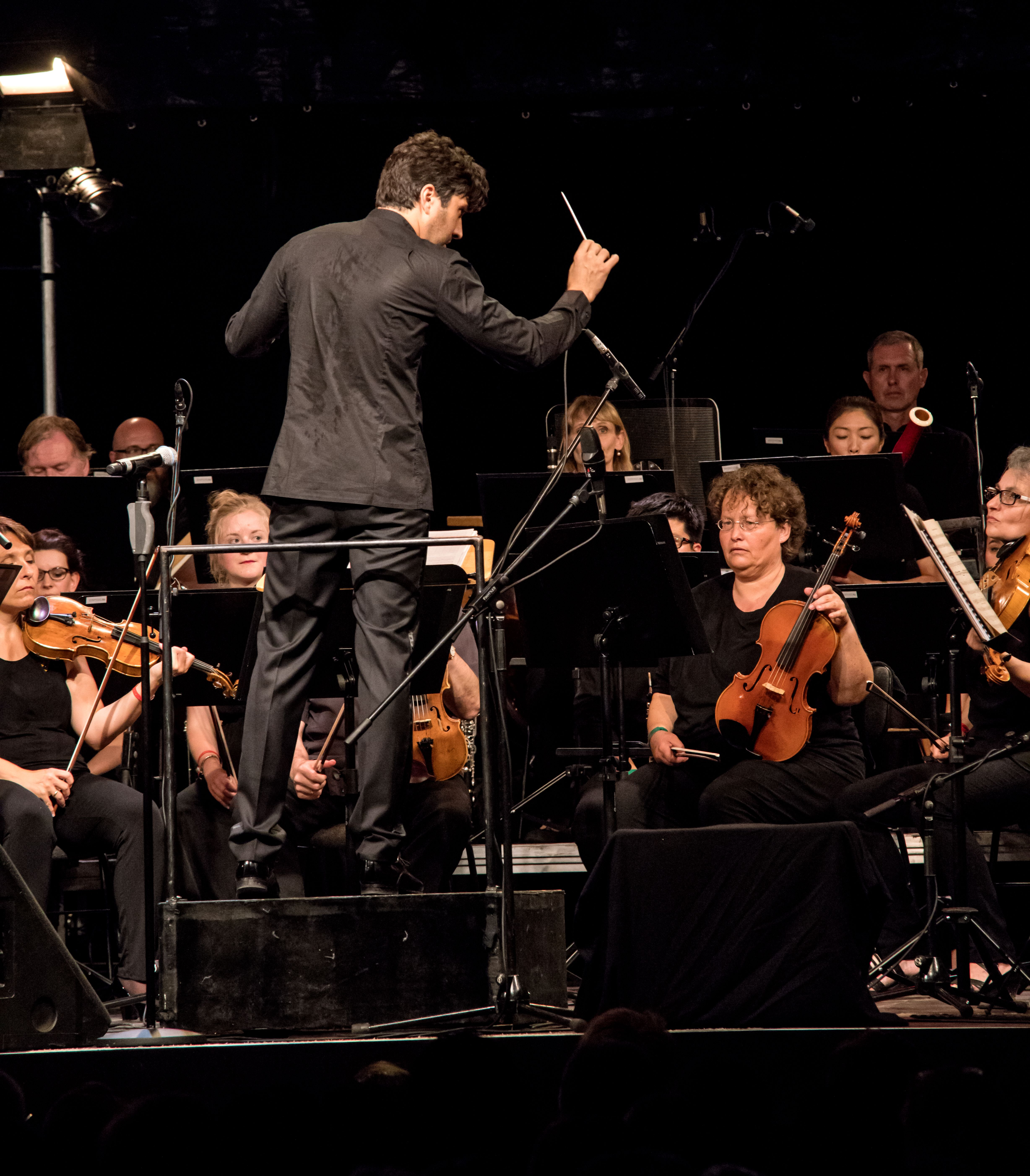
David Afkham conducting the orchestra for the ZMF

Philharmonisches Orchester Freiburg (Freiburg Philharmonic) is the symphony orchestra of Freiburg im Breisgau, Germany, founded in 1887. It plays concerts in the Konzerthaus Freiburg and opera in the Theater Freiburg.

== History ==
The Freiburg Philharmonic Orchestra was founded in 1887 and since then has worked with artists such as Clara Schumann and Richard Strauss. The Philharmonic Society, founded by Hermann Dimmler in 1877, had already existed before this, bringing well-known musicians and composers such as Eugen d'Albert and Franz Liszt to Freiburg. From 1867, there was the post of municipal bandmaster, who directed the theatre orchestra consisting of military musicians and laymen. At the time the orchestra was founded, the Kapellmeister Giesecker was the conductor of the ensemble. The first appearance of the new Philharmonic Orchestra was on 4 October 1887 under the direction of Kapellmeister Wilhelm Bruch. The programme included Wagner's Tannhäuser Overture, pieces from the opera King Manfred by Carl Reinecke and the 2nd Rhapsody by Franz Liszt. From 1890 to 1919, the orchestra was conducted by Gustav Starke, with the emphasis on opera. In 1910, the theatre building was opened and the ensemble was expanded to 60 members. After the First World War, the work was continued by Camillo Hildebrand. In 1924, Max Krüger became the new artistic director and he appointed Ewald Lindemann (1924–1929) as Generalmusikdirektor (GMD) of Freiburg. He was replaced in 1929 by Hugo Balzer, who was succeeded by Franz Konwitschny in 1933. After Franz Konwitschny left Freiburg in 1938, Bruno Vondenhoff followed. In 1945, Wilhelm Schleunig was in charge, who was replaced by Heinz Dressel in 1951. Hans Gierster took over the management in 1956. He was replaced in 1966 by Leopold Hager, followed in 1969 (coming from Remscheid) by Thomas Ungar.

The further artistic direction of the orchestra and the opera was subsequently entrusted to the conductors (GMD) Marek Janowski. (1973–1975), Klauspeter Seibel (1975–1978), Klaus Weise (1978–1981), Ádám Fischer (1981–1983), Eberhard Kloke (1983–1989), Donald Runnicles (1989–1993), Johannes Fritzsch (1993–2000), Kwamé Ryan (2000–2003), Karen Kamensek (2003–2006), Patrik Ringborg and Gerhard Markson. Traditionally, the repertoire in opera and concert consists of a balanced mixture of classical and contemporary music.

Since 2008, the French conductor Fabrice Bollon is GMD. The orchestra is committed to child and youth work.
