= Heribert Beissel =

German orchestra conductor (1933-2021)

- Born: 27 March 1933; Wesel, Germany
- Died: 11 June 2021 (aged 88); Germany
- Education: Hochschule für Musik Köln
- Occupation: Conductor
- Organizations: Hamburger Symphoniker; Folkwang Kammerorchester Essen; Klassische Philharmonie Bonn; Philharmonisches Staatsorchester Halle; Landesjugendorchester Sachsen-Anhalt; Brandenburgisches Staatsorchester
- Awards: Johannes Brahms Medal; Order of Merit of the Federal Republic of Germany; Order of Merit of Saxony-Anhalt

Heribert Beissel (27 March 1933 – 11 June 2021) was a German conductor. While based in Bonn for decades, as conductor at the Bonn Opera and as founder and conductor of the Klassische Philharmonie Bonn, he also held leading positions in Halle (Saale) and Frankfurt (Oder) after the German reunification. His discography covers composers from Bach to Debussy.

== Life and career ==
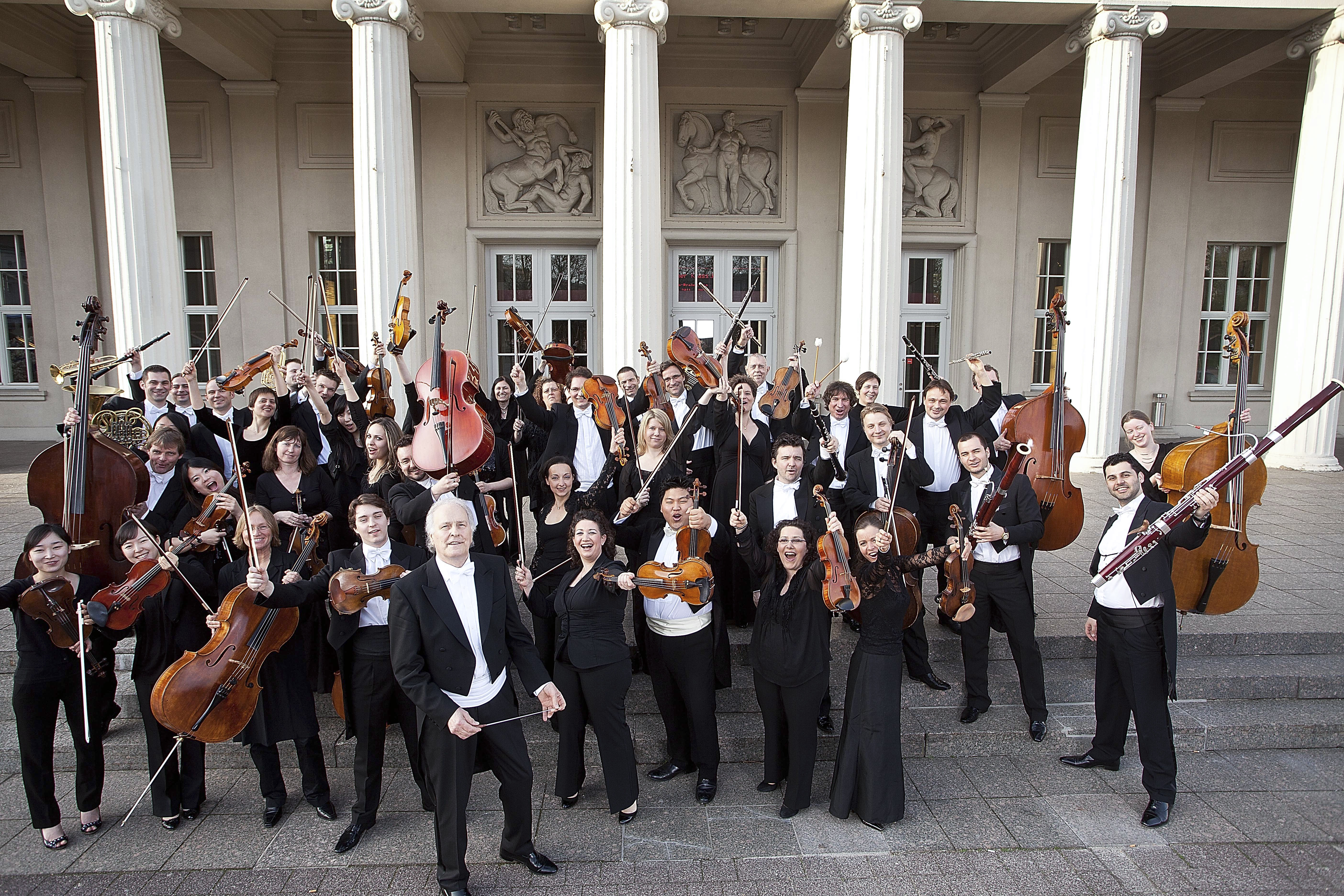
Klassische Philharmonie Bonn in 2011

Born in Wesel, Beissel attended the Collegium Augustinianum Gaesdonck, a humanistic gymnasium. He studied piano and conducting at the Hochschule für Musik Köln, conducting with Günter Wand and composition with Frank Martin. He began his conducting career as a repetiteur and soon Kapellmeister at the Bonn Opera in 1955, where he remained until 1964. He founded the Chur Cölnisches Solistenensemble in 1958, dedicated to the music at the Bonn court of the Electors of Cologne. In 1968, he also founded the Chur Cölnischer Chor Bonn.

Beissel was the chief conductor of the Hamburger Symphoniker from 1971 to 1985. During this period, he also collaborated with the Hamburg State Opera and the Hamburg Ballet directed by John Neumeier. He was conductor of the Folkwang Kammerorchester Essen at the Folkwang Hochschule from 1979 to 1984. In 1986, the Chur Cölnisches Orchester was expanded to the Klassische Philharmonie Bonn.

After the German reunification, he was chief conductor of the Philharmonisches Staatsorchester Halle from 1991 to 1999, and was also the founder and conductor of the Landesjugendorchester Sachsen-Anhalt. From 2001 to 2006 he was Generalmusikdirektor of the Brandenburgisches Staatsorchester in Frankfurt (Oder).

Heribert Beissel died on 11 June 2021 at age 88.

== Recordings ==
Beissel and the Klassische Philharmonie Bonn recorded piano concertos by Mozart, No. 12 in A major and No. 9 in E Major, with soloist Ekaterina Litvintseva in 2013. They recorded the First Piano Concerto by Johannes Brahms live in 2017, with Ekaterina Litvintseva as the soloist.

== Awards ==
- 1962: First prize conducting competition of Deutscher Musikrat and the NDR in Hanover
- 1982: Johannes Brahms Medal of Hamburg with Hamburger Symphoniker
- 1998: Order of Merit of the Federal Republic of Germany
- 2004: Kultursenator of Saxony-Anhalt
- 2006: Honorary conductor of Brandenburgisches Staatsorchester Frankfurt
- 2012: Order of Merit of Saxony-Anhalt

Cultural offices
Preceded by Olaf Koch	Music Director, Staatsorchester Halle; 1991–1999	Succeeded by Wolf-Dieter Hauschild
