= Boris Böhmann =

German conductor and composer

Boris Böhmann (born July 19, 1964) is a German conductor and composer.

He was born in Worms am Rhein, was musical assistant at his home church, Worms Cathedral, between 1987 and 1990. His studies in Catholic theology at Johannes Gutenberg University in Mainz were followed with studies at the College of Music in Detmold (church music and conducting) between 1988 and 1993. The "Vocal Ensemble at St. Martin" in Worms was founded in 1990 on his initiative, and he has been musical director of the ensemble until 2004. After his artistic A examination in 1993, he was appointed choir director at the Papal Basilica of St. Mary's in Kevelaer. Here he conducted the different ensembles of music at the basilica, consisting of more than 250 members (two children's choirs, the youth school, choir, orchestra, choral school and winds).

Between 2000 and 2001, Boris Böhmann was chairman of the Association of Church Musicians in the bishopric of Münster. Since 1996, he has been a member of the national committee of the German choir association "Pueri Cantores" and since 1999 also held a position as a member of the presidency committee.

In 2003, he was appointed cathedral director of music and headmaster of the cathedral singing school, succeeding prelate Dr. Raimund Hug at the Freiburg Minster in southwest Germany, where he conducts the choirs at the Freiburg cathedral (Freiburg cathedral boys' choir, cathedral choir, cathedral chamber choir and cathedral Orchestra). Numerous concert appointments took him all over Germany, Europe, Australia and Asia. Productions for television, radio and on CD with him as conductor of choirs and organ player document his musical work.

Since 2006 he has a training order for conducting and musical training of boys and children choirs at the university of music, Freiburg.

== See also ==
- Freiburg Cathedral Boys' Choir
- Choirs
- List of 20th century classical composers
