= Moye Kolodin =

German musician

Moye Kolodin (born 5 May 1987 in Freiburg, West Germany) is a German classical pianist.

== Career ==
Kolodin received his very first piano lessons at the age of seven from his mother Elza Kolodin. Kolodin won the first prize and the Sparkasse prize for Outstanding Young Talents at the Jugend Musiziert competition five years later. In 1999, he enrolled at the Hochschule für Musik Freiburg, and continued his musical studies there under the tutelage of Elza Kolodin until 2006.

Kolodin participates regularly in the Master Classes of many world-renowned professors, whose names include Vitaly Margulis, Hans Leygraf, Jacques Rouvier, Dmitri Bashkirov, Joaquín Soriano and Vera Gornostayeva. Internationally he has won awards at the "Ciutat de Carlet" and "Vila de Capdepera" competitions in Spain, the Associazione "Fryderyk Chopin's 14th Concorso Internationale per Giovani Pianisti" in 2004 in Rome, the first prize at the "Concours International de Piano de Brest" in France in 2005, and the Grand Prix at the "Evangelia Tjiarri Foundation" International Piano Competition in Larnaka, Cyprus in March 2006. In May that same year, he was also presented with the European cultural award "Pro Europa" at the Paul Klee Zentrum in Bern, Switzerland.

Kolodin enjoys frequent engagements with various ensembles and orchestras such as the Schlesischen Philharmonie Kattowitz, the Landesjugendorchester Baden-Württemberg, the Capella Bydgostiensis and Stuttgarter Kammerorchester, with whom he has performed concerti by Mozart, Liszt and Brahms and a lot of other engagements. His playing constantly receives glowing reviews from local press, who have praised him for his "phenomenal mastery", "amazing talent", "breathtaking playing" and "soaring at the piano" and have described him as "a musical exceptionality" and "a genius and poet".

As a scholarship holder of the Studienstiftung des Deutschen Volkes, Kolodin has been a student of Jacques Rouvier at the Conservatoire Superieur de Musique de Paris since Fall 2006.
