= IDF March =

Marching music of the Israel Defense Forces

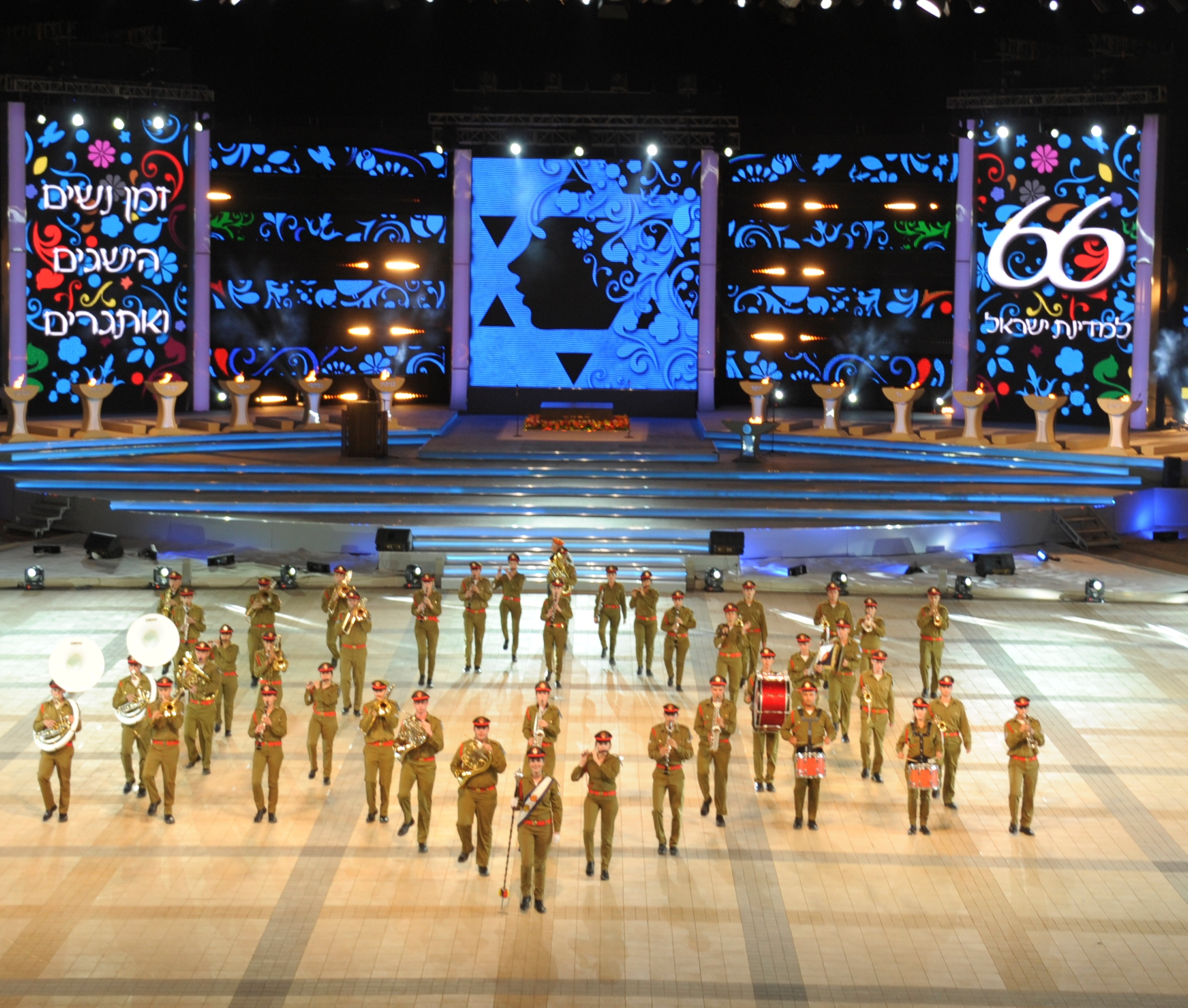
IDF marching band

IDF March (Hebrew: מארש צה"ל or צה"ל צועד, Tzahal Tzo'ed) is the official march music of the Israel Defense Forces (IDF), which is played in ceremonies and parades held by the military. It was written in 1963 by composer Yoav Talmi.

== History ==
Until 1963, the IDF did not have any official march, and the song "Kitatenu Balayla Tzoedet" was used to accompany the marches.

At the beginning of 1963, a competition was declared for an official march song for the IDF, with 208 competing composers registering to the contest. The marches that made it to the final stage of the competition were played by the IDF Orchestra (led by Conductor Izhak Graziani) to the general public at Heichal Hatarbut concert hall, and the Army Radio broadcast the ceremony live to all army bases. The jury included senior musicians on the one hand, and IDF soldiers themselves on the other. The soldiers cast their votes by phone. Yoav Talmi's march song was unanimously chosen.

Corporal Yoav Talmi, then a 19-year-old young player in the IDF's orchestra and a student of composition at the Israel Conservatory of Music in Tel Aviv, registered for the contest anonymously. In second place came Meir Wiesel, and third place was won by Ephraim Katz, both also IDF's orchestra players.

== See also ==
- Music of Israel
- Culture of Israel
