= Liisa Karhilo =

Finnish pianist and composer

- Born: 9 September 1930; Pori
- Died: 4 May 1998 (aged 67); Helsinki
- Occupation: Pianist
- Spouse(s): Aarno Karhilo

Liisa Karhilo (9 September 1930 – 4 May 1998) was a Finnish pianist and composer.

Liisa Karhilo was born on 9 September 1930 in Pori. She graduated from the Sibelius Academy in 1953 and later studied at the Vienna Academy of Music and graduated with a master's in music education from Columbia University.

Her first piano concert was in 1954. She married ambassador Aarno Karhilo and travelled with him to his various postings, performing concerts in person and on the radio around the world.

She published Sinaa ja minaa ("You and Me"), a series of elementary duets for violin or violincello and piano. She recorded Twentieth-Century Finnish Piano Music, published in the United States in two record albums by the Musical Heritage Society, a collection of music by Finnish composers Jean Sibelius, Aarre Merikanto, Joonas Kokkonen, Erik Bergman, and Einojuhani Rautavaara.

Liisa Karhilo died on 4 May 1998 in Helsinki.

== Compositions ==
- Sinaa ja minaa: elementary duets (for violin or violincello and piano) (Fazer, 1977)

== Discography ==
- Twentieth-Century Finnish Piano Music (Finnlevy SFX 45, 1977)
- Twentieth-Century Finnish Piano Music (Musical Heritage Society 3401, 1977)
- Twentieth-Century Finnish Piano Music II (Musical Heritage Society 3596)
