= Symphoniker Hamburg =

German orchestra based in Hamburg

Hamburg Symphony Orchestra
- orchestra
- Native name: Symphoniker Hamburg
- Founded: 1957
- Location: Dammtorwall 46; 20355 Hamburg, Germany
- Concert hall: Laeiszhalle
- Principal conductor: Sylvain Cambreling
- Website: www.symphonikerhamburg.de

The Symphoniker Hamburg (transl. Hamburg Symphony Orchestra) is a German orchestra based in Hamburg, Germany. Founded in 1957, it is one of the city's three largest orchestras. The Hamburg Symphony Orchestra is the orchestra in residence in the Laeiszhalle, the Hamburg Music Hall. In addition to symphony concerts, the Hamburg Symphony regularly performs as accompanying ensembles for operas and ballets at the Hamburg State Opera House. The orchestra also offers subscription series of children's concerts, and annual open-air concerts held in the central courtyard of Hamburg's town hall.

== History ==
The Hamburg Symphony Orchestra gave its first concert on 16 October 1957 under the direction of its first chief conductor, Robert Heger. Heger served in the post until 1961. His successors included Heribert Beissel, who has held the longest tenure as chief conductor to date from 1972–1986, Carlos Kalmar (1987–1991), Miguel Ángel Gómez Martínez (1992–1999), and Yoav Talmi (2000–2004). Principal guest conductors have included István Kertész.

Andrey Boreyko was principal conductor from 2004 until his sudden resignation in the autumn of 2007. Jeffrey Tate was appointed chief conductor in October 2007 and took up the post in the spring of 2008. In February 2014, the orchestra announced the extension of Tate's contract as chief conductor through 2019. Tate held the post until his death on 2 June 2017.

In February 2018, the orchestra announced the appointment of Sylvain Cambreling as its next chief conductor, effective with the 2018–2019 season. In June 2022, the orchestra announced the extension of Cambreling's contract through the summer of 2028.

In October 2021, Han-na Chang first guest-conducted the orchestra, as an emergency substitute conductor. Following the appearance, the Hamburger Symphoniker appointed Chang as its principal guest conductor (Erste Gastdirigentin), the first female conductor to be named to the post, effective with the 2022–2023 season.

Recordings with the Hamburg Symphony Orchestra have appeared on Musikproduktion Dabringhaus und Grimm, edel classics and Deutsche Grammophon (Deutscher Schallplattenpreis ECHO Klassik).

== Chief conductors ==
- Robert Heger (1957–1961)
- Gabor Ötvös (1961–1967)
- Wilfried Boettcher (1967–1971)
- Heribert Beissel (1972–1986)
- Carlos Kalmar (1987–1991)
- Miguel Gómez-Martínez (1992–1999)
- Yoav Talmi (2000–2004)
- Andrey Boreyko (2004–2007)
- Sir Jeffrey Tate (2009–2017)
- Sylvain Cambreling (2018–present)
