= Yoav Talmi =

Israeli conductor-composer

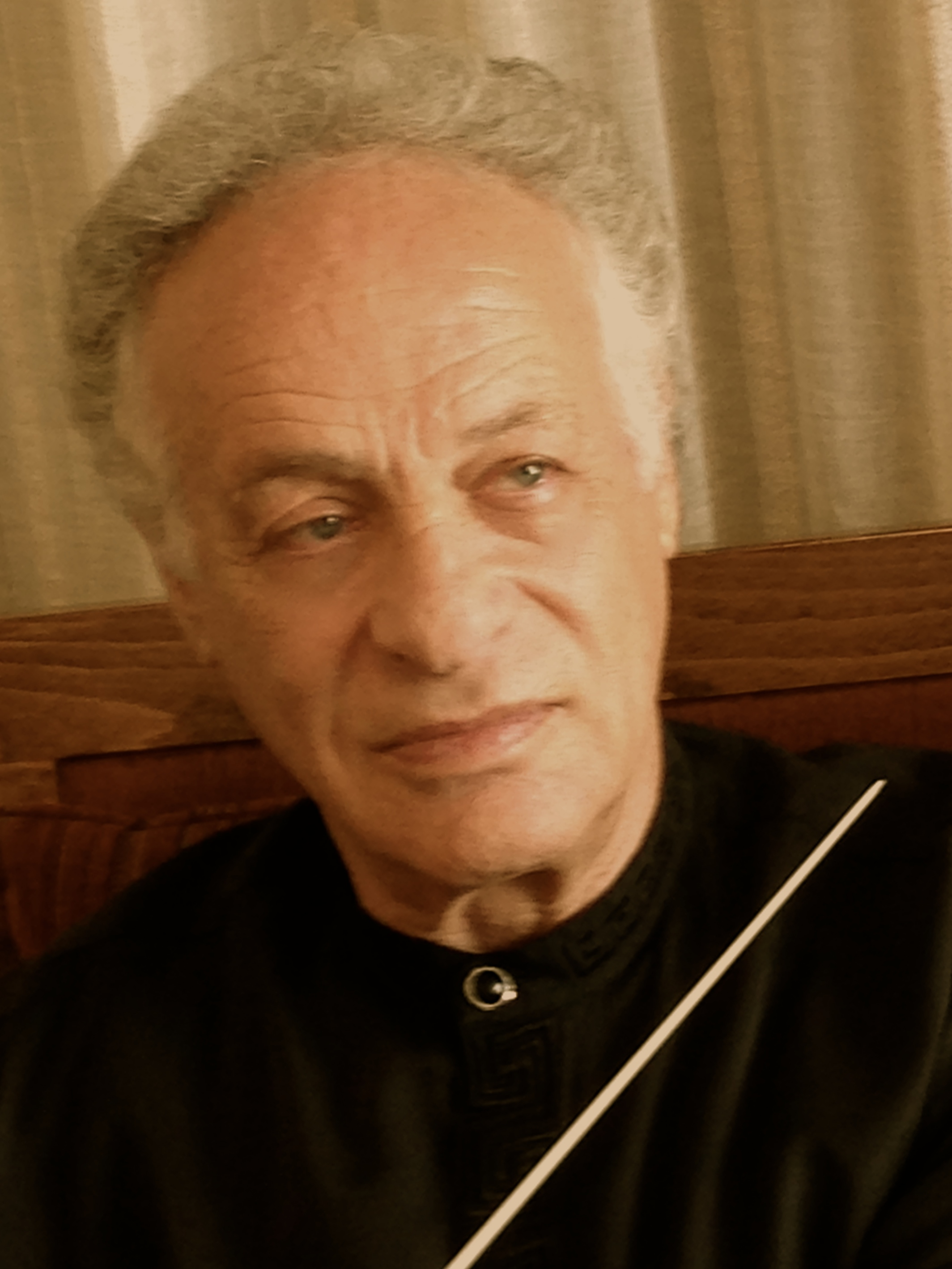
Yoav Talmi

Yoav Talmi OQ (Hebrew: יואב תלמי; born April 28, 1943), is an Israeli conductor and composer.

== Biography ==
Yoav Talmi was born in Kibbutz Merhavia. He studied composition and orchestral direction, first in Israel at the Rubin Academy of Music (later renamed The Buchmann-Mehta School of Music) in Tel Aviv, and then in the United States of America at the Juilliard School. In 1966 Talmi was awarded the Koussevitzky Conducting Prize at the Tanglewood Music Center. In 1973 he won the Rupert Foundation Conducting Competition in London.

Yoav Talmi is married to Er'ella, flautist and author of children's books and adult novels. They have two children. In 2001, the Université Laval awarded Talmi an Honorary Doctorate. In 2009, he was made an Officer of the National Order of Quebec. Yoav Talmi won the 2013 Israeli Prime Minister's Prize for Composers.

== Music career ==
Talmi was music director of the Arnhem Philharmonic from 1974 to 1980. Between 1977 and 1979 he served as the Principal Guest Conductor of the Munich Philharmonic and From 1984 to 1988, he was music director of the Israel Chamber Orchestra (ICO) in Tel Aviv. Between 1985 to 1959 he served as the first music director of the Israeli Opera. Talmi served as music director of the San Diego Symphony from 1987 to 1996, and made several recordings with them for the Naxos label. He was Music Director of l'Orchestre Symphonique de Québec (Québec Symphony Orchestra) from 1998 to 2011, and now carries the title of conductor emeritus of the orchestra. He was Chief Conductor of the Hamburg Symphony Orchestra from 2000 to 2004. In February 2013, Talmi returned to the ICO as its music director, a post he held until 2015.

Talmi's compositions include the official march of the Israeli Army, Tsahal Tso'ed, an Elegy for Strings, Timpani and Accordion ("Dachau Reflections"). His composition "De Profundis for Choir and Orchestra" premiered in Quebec City in May 2011. His "Animi Motus" For Children's (or Women) Choir was premiered by the Jerusalem Symphony in 2015. Other major works are a Clarinet Quintet (2017), "How She Sat Alone" for Soprano and orchestra, Sinfonia Camerata for chamber orchestra, and many other compositions and arrangements. Talmi is the head of the conducting department at The Buchmann-Mehta School of Music. Tel Aviv University. His compositions are published by the Israel Music institute (IMI), Kalmus Edition USA, Carl Fischer Music, Broekmans en van Poppel, Amsterdam and Les Production d'Oz, Canada.

== See also ==
- Music of Israel

Preceded by Leo Driehuys	Chief Conductor, Het Gelders Orkest; 1974–1980	Succeeded by Roberto Benzi
Preceded by David Atherton	Music Director, San Diego Symphony; 1987–1996	Succeeded by Jung-Ho Pak (artistic director)
Preceded by Miguel Gomez-Martinez	Chief Conductor, Hamburg Symphony Orchestra; 2000–2004	Succeeded by Andrey Boreyko
Preceded by Roberto Paternostro (artistic adviser)	Music Director, Israel Chamber Orchestra; 2013–2014	Succeeded by Ariel Zuckermann
