= Thomas Ungar =

Austrian conductor

Thomas Ungar (16 May 1931 – 4 April 2026) was an Austrian conductor, music educator and lecturer.

== Life and career ==
Born in Budapest, Ungar became conductor of the Philharmonie Südwestfalen in 1959, once the "Siegerlandorchester" in Hilchenbach/Westf. In 1961 he became municipal music director of the Bergische Symphoniker in Remscheid, in 1966 Generalmusikdirektor at the Theater Regensburg and in 1969 at the Philharmonisches Orchester Freiburg.

From 1973, he was professor at the State University of Music and Performing Arts Stuttgart. He has been a guest conductor in Europe and the US and has made numerous radio, television and record recordings. These include the Landesjugendorchester Baden-Württemberg, the Mozarteum Orchestra Salzburg and many others.

== Students ==
- Bernd Ruf
- Christoph Adt
- Christian Fitzner
- Ivo Hentschel
- Gerhard Jenemann
- Johannes Klumpp
- Matthias Manasi
- Veronika Stoertzenbach
