= Landesjugendorchester Baden-Württemberg =

Youth orchestra in Baden-Württemberg, Germany

The Landesjugendorchester Baden-Württemberg (Youth Orchestra of Baden-Wuerttemberg, LJO), founded in 1972, is a youth orchestra based in the German state of Baden-Württemberg. The orchestra gives a concert tour in Baden-Württemberg twice a year, and has travelled abroad on several occasions.

== History and structure of the LJO ==
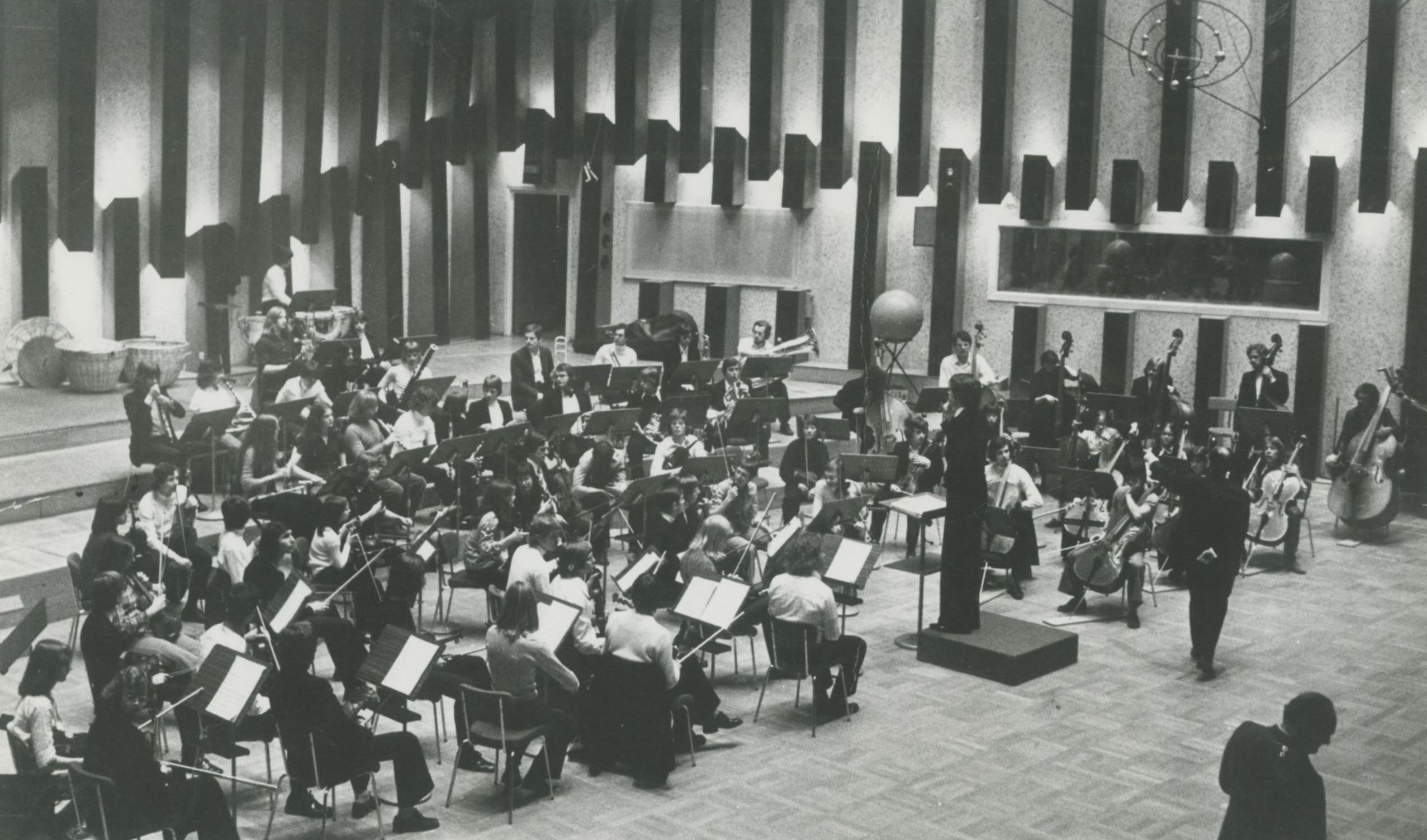
LJO BW 1972

The Landesjugendorchester Baden-Württemberg was founded in 1972 by Klaus Matakas and Dietmar Mantel. They put together an ensemble of young musicians, who at that time had already been playing in the symphony orchestra of the music school in Lahr, appointing Christoph Wyneken as conductor. Shortly thereafter, a hand-picked selection of musicians as well as "Jugend musiziert" (Teenagers performing Classical Music) laureates from all over Baden-Wuerttemberg applied to audition.

The LJO has numerous partnerships with other German orchestras. On 7 November 2005, for instance, on the occasion of the joint initiative of the Association of German Orchestras, the German Jeunesses Musicales and the Association of German Conservatoires, the Stuttgart State Orchestra and the Youth Orchestra of Baden-Wuerttemberg launched the "tutti pro" orchestra partnership. Other partnerships were formed during concert tours abroad.

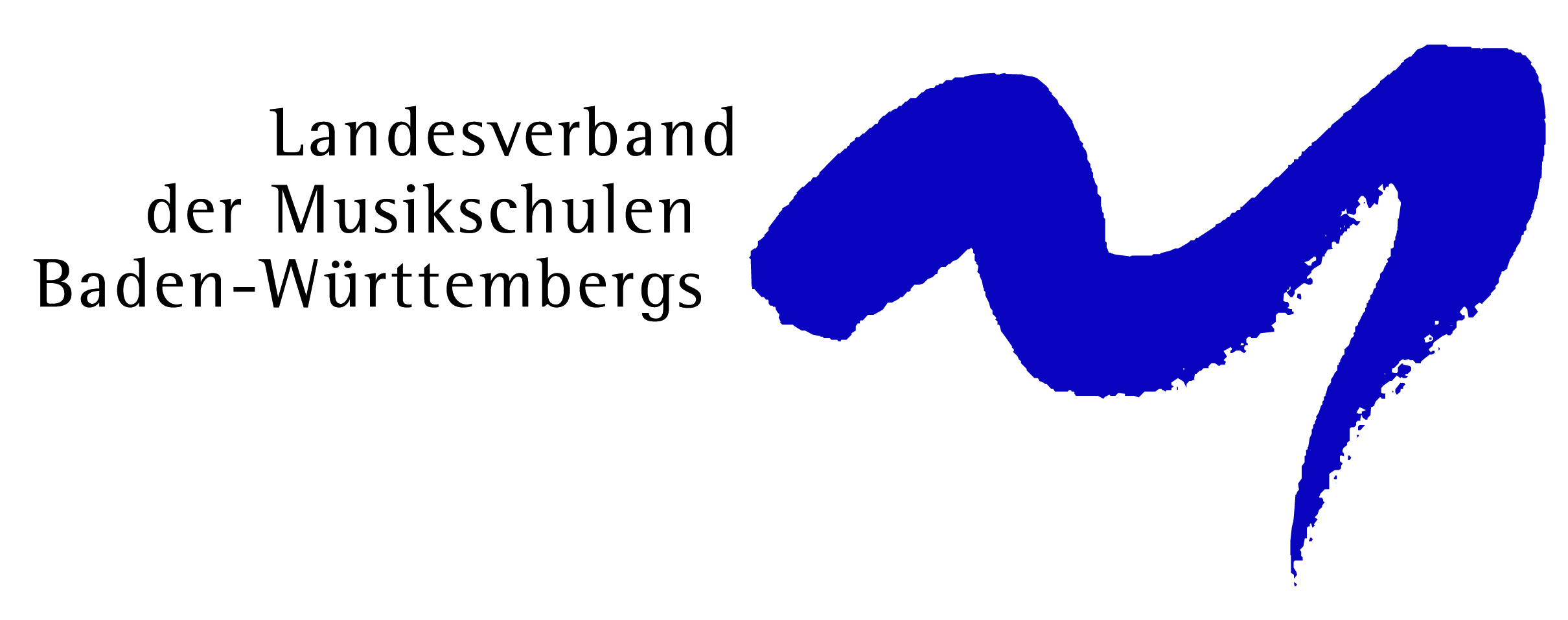
Logo of the LvdM e.V.

To enter the "LJO Pool" musicians have to pass an audition. The "LJO Pool" contains about 350 young musicians aged between 13 and 22, who play all kinds of orchestral instruments. Between 85 and 120 musicians participate in each working phase.

Logo of the FSJ Kultur (voluntary cultural year)

The office of the LJO is in Stuttgart-North in the rooms of the "Landesverband der Musikschulen Baden-Württemberg" (roughly translated as "state association of the music schools of Baden-Wuerttemberg"). Since 2008, the LJO has been employing one volunteer each year ("voluntary cultural year"(FSJ Kultur)).

== Artistic director ==
The co-founder of the Youth Orchestra of Baden-Wuerttemberg, Christoph Wyneken, was actively engaged as the creative director until 2013, from which point onward the creative director as well as conductor have been replaced at the start of every work period. Johannes Klumpp is the creative advisor.

== Working phase (schedule) ==
As the LJO is a project orchestra, no regular weekly rehearsals take place but working phases twice a year, always in the Easter and autumn holidays. In these periods, full-length concert programmes are rehearsed, which contain classical-romantic pieces of the concert literature as well as new music.

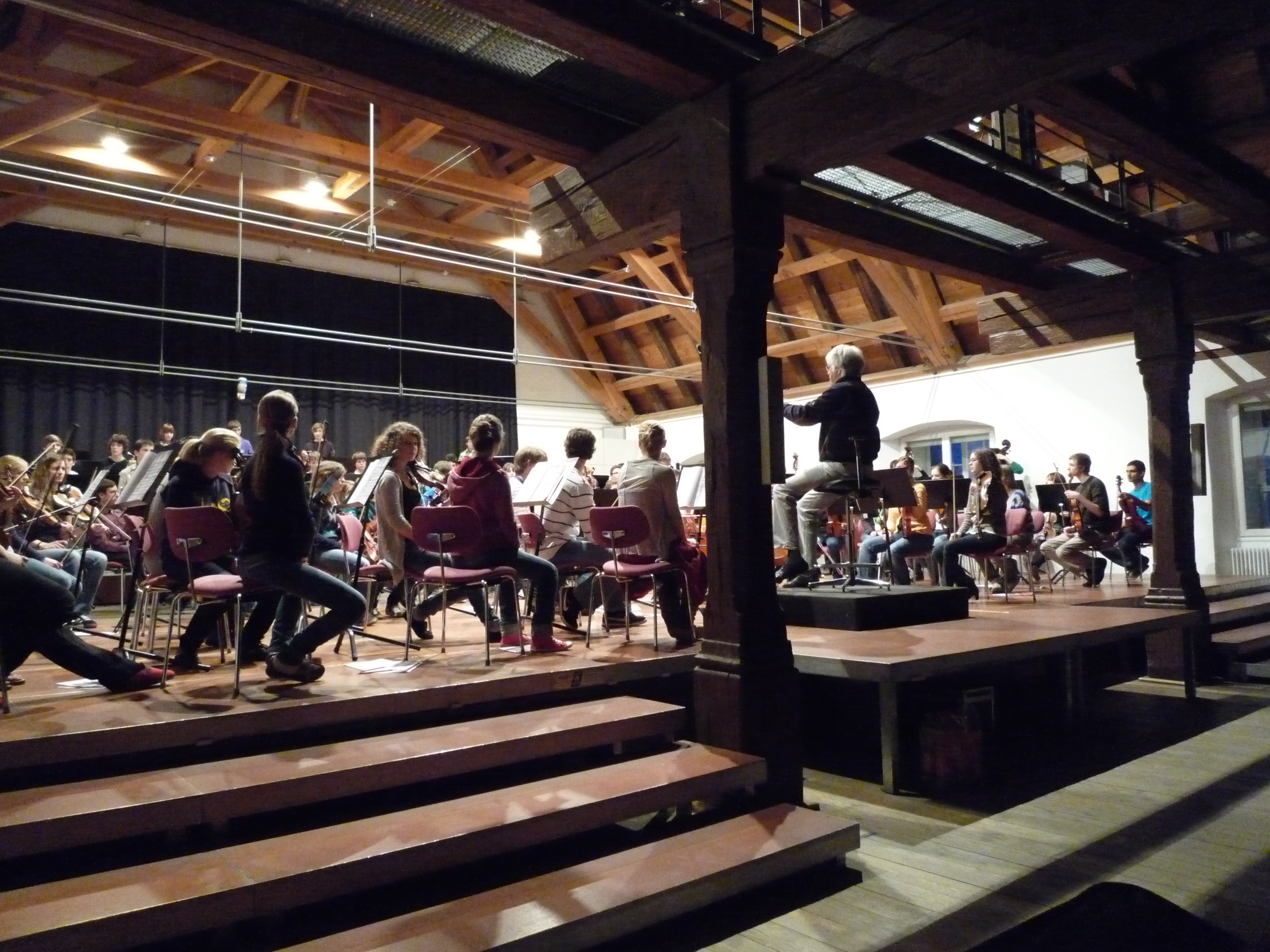
Rehearsal of the LJO BW

Every working phase contains extensive rehearsals of the chosen pieces with section (register) rehearsals which are supervised by top-class tutors as well as tutti-rehearsals with the artistic director of the respective working phase. Every working phase is followed by a concert tour throughout Baden-Württemberg with up to 7 concerts. There are also some special projects with shorter rehearsal times and fewer concerts.

== Audition ==
Auditions usually take place once a year in the Stuttgart area, giving musicians opportunity to showcase their talent and skills. The audition panel comprises creative advisors and tutors of the instrument. Audition dates are announced on the official website of the Youth Orchestra of Baden-Wuerttemberg. Once the date has been set and made public, musicians interested in participating can register and choose the most convenient date from a list of possible audition dates. The orchestral audition comprises a ten-minute performance. The applicant is expected to prepare and play orchestral excerpts and a fast and slow movement free of choice, but usually encompassing two periods of classical music. If the participant is successful in passing the audition, they become part of the orchestra pool and may be selected for upcoming rehearsals and concerts.

== International trips ==
- Italy (1983)
- France (1989)
- Spain (1991)
- United Kingdom (1994)
- Russia (1995)
- Poland (2002)
- Egypt (2006)
- Madagascar (2008)
- Ecuador (2009)

=== Madagascar ===
On 15 May 2008 Germany and Madagascar celebrated the 125th anniversary of the German–Madagascan Treaty of Friendship. As part of the "Aktion Afrika" ("Action Africa") and in cooperation with the German Ambassy in Antananarivo the Foreign Office planned the official festivities on the fourth biggest island in the world. Receiving an invitation to form the accompanying cultural programme between 9 and 19 May, the LJO delegated a 19 member brass ensemble.

=== Ecuador ===
From September 1 to 18 2009, the Youth Orchestra of Baden-Wuerttemberg, boasting an ensemble of 45 musicians, performed a total of fifteen concerts to celebrate the 200th anniversary of Ecuadorian independence, all under the leadership of artistic director Christoph Wyneken. The orchestra also hosted a number of workshops and meet-and-greet events with Ecuadorian school children. After meeting with its fellow orchestra "Orquestra Sinfónica Juvenil de Guayaquil” in Guayaquil, the Youth Orchestra of Baden-Wuerttemberg performed a joint concert alongside its Ecuadorian counterpart, playing the first movement of Ludwig van Beethoven’s Symphony No. 5.

== Financing ==
The Youth Orchestra of Baden-Wuerttemberg has numerous supporters and sponsors including the federal state of Baden-Wuerttemberg, the association of savings banks of Baden-Wuerttemberg, the regional association of music schools of Baden-Wuerttemberg and the Stuttgart State Orchestra.

Concert revenue constitutes another major source of income. The sponsorship association and the Foundation of the Youth Orchestra of Baden-Wuerttemberg provide additional financial backing, as well as the revenue generated by the sales of CDs, DVDs and programmes.

== Awards and nominations ==
=== Awards ===
- European Prize of the Youth Orchestra of the foundation "Pro Europa" ("Pro Europe"), on 2 November 2008
- "Leonberger Jugendmusikpreis" (Prize of the city of Leonberg (near Stuttgart) for young musicians), 27 times in a row, last time in 2010

=== Nominations ===
- "Kulturmarken-Award" ("Cultural Mark Award") 2008 (presented by KulturSPIEGEL) – one of the "trend marks in 2008" (as first youth orchestra ever). The Kulturmarken-Award is promoted by Škoda Germany, Apollinaris (mineral water company), Bionade and the Deutschen Bahn AG.
- "Kulturmarken-Award" 2015 – "European Education Programme of 2015" with the special programme Apollo 18 – Musiktheater im Jugendknast ("Apollo 18 – music theatre in the juvenile prison")

== Productions ==
The LJO produced several CDs and DVDs, some of which include the following:

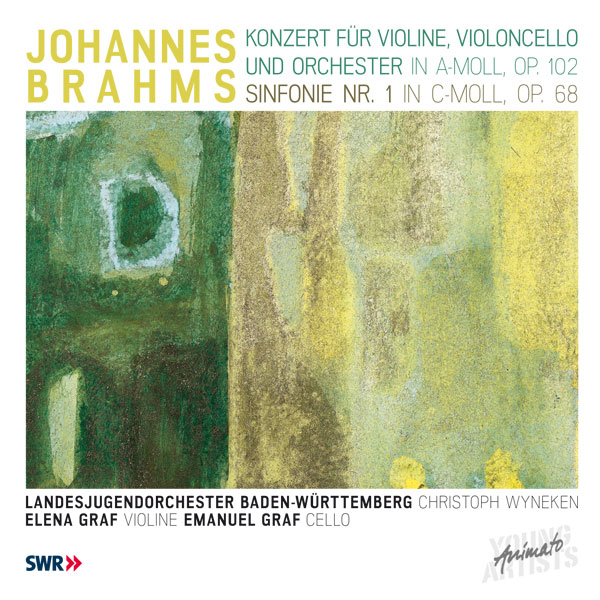
Brahm's Double Concerto & 1st Symphony

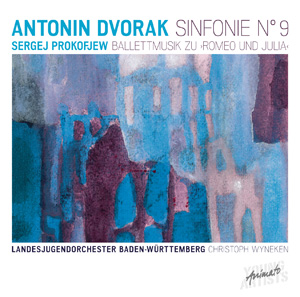
Dvořák's 9th Symphony & Romeo and Juliet

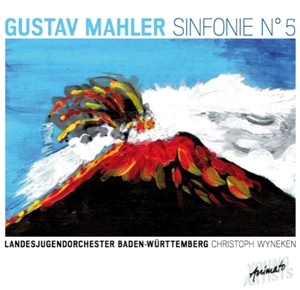
Mahler's 5th Symphony

Name	Year	Program
Johannes Brahms: Double Concerto op. 102, Symphony No. 1 op. 68	2011	Johannes Brahms: Concert for Violin, Violoncello and Orchestra in A minor, op. 102; Johannes Brahms: Symphony No. 1 in C minor, op. 68
Sehnsucht, Traum und Walkürenritt ("Desire, Dream and Walkürenritt")	2010	Richard Wagner: Ride of the Valkyries; Gioachino Rossini: William Tell Overture; Diverse ballads of Gustav Mahler; Pyotr Ilyich Tchaikovsky: 1812 Overture; Arturo Márquez: Danzón No. 2; Georges Bizet: Farandole of the L'Arlésienne-Suite No. 2
Antonín Dvořák: Symphony No. 9 E minor, op. 95 "Aus der neuen Welt"	2009	Antonín Dvořák: Symphony No. 9 "From the New World"; Sergei Prokofiev: Excerpts from the ballet music of Romeo and Juliet
Concert of the LJO foundation	2008	Gioachino Rossini: Excerpts from The Barber of Seville; Pyotr Ilyich Tchaikovsky: Polonaise from Eugene Onegin; Johann Strauss II: The Blue Danube; Franz von Suppé: Overture to Leichte Kavallerie; Jacques Offenbach: "Can Can" from Orpheus in the Underworld; Johann Strauss II: "Unter Donner und Blitz" ("Beneath Thunder and Lightning"), fast polka; Arie Maasland "Malando": Olé Guapa (Tango)
Gustav Mahler – Symphony No. 5	2008	Gustav Mahler: Symphony No. 5
35th Anniversary of the LJO	2007	Bedřich Smetana: "On Bohemia's Meadows and Fields" from Má vlast (My Homeland); Pablo de Sarasate: Excerpts from Carmen-Fantasy; Pyotr Ilyich Tchaikovsky: "Valse" from Symphony No. 5; Pyotr Ilyich Tchaikovsky: "Pezzo capriccioso" for Cello and orchestra; Johann Strauss II: Egyptischer Marsch; Gioachino Rossini: William Tell Overture; Felix Mendelssohn Bartholdy: Andante from Symphony No. 5; Heitor Villa-Lobos: Aria from „Bachianas brasileiras No. 5“; Richard Strauss: "Dance of the Seven Veils" from Salome

== Guest conductors and soloists ==
The LJO has worked together with many reputable artists. A selection:

=== Guest conductors/artistic directors ===
- Thomas Ungar
- Till Drömann
- Patrick Strub
- Wolf-Dieter Hauschild
- Nicolas Pasquet
- David Afkham
- Hannes Krämer (Autumn 2014)
- Hermann Bäumer (Spring 2015)
- Anna-Sophie Brüning (Autumn 2015 – Apollo 18!)
- Johannes Klumpp (Autumn 2015)
- David Philip Hefti (Spring 2016)
- Peter Tilling (Autumn 2016)

=== Soloists ===
- Aaron Rosand, Alexander Sitkowetski, Alexander Zeiher, Koh Gabriel Kameda, Ulrike Anima Mathé, Maria-Elisabeth Lott, Lukas Stepp, Elena Graf, Oscar Bohórquez, Kathrin Scheungraber (violin)
- Tabea Zimmermann, Boris Faust, Hanna Breuer (viola)
- Christoph Henkel, Claudio Bohórquez, Emanuel Graf (cello)
- Kersten McCall (flute)
- Markus Frank (horn)
- Wolfgang Bauer, Reinhold Friedrich (trumpet)
- Xiao Xiao Zhu, Moye Kolodin, Alexej Gorlatch (piano)
- Jakob Spahn (cello)
- Esther Hoppe (violin)
