= Klassische Philharmonie Bonn =

German symphony orchestra

- Symphony orchestra
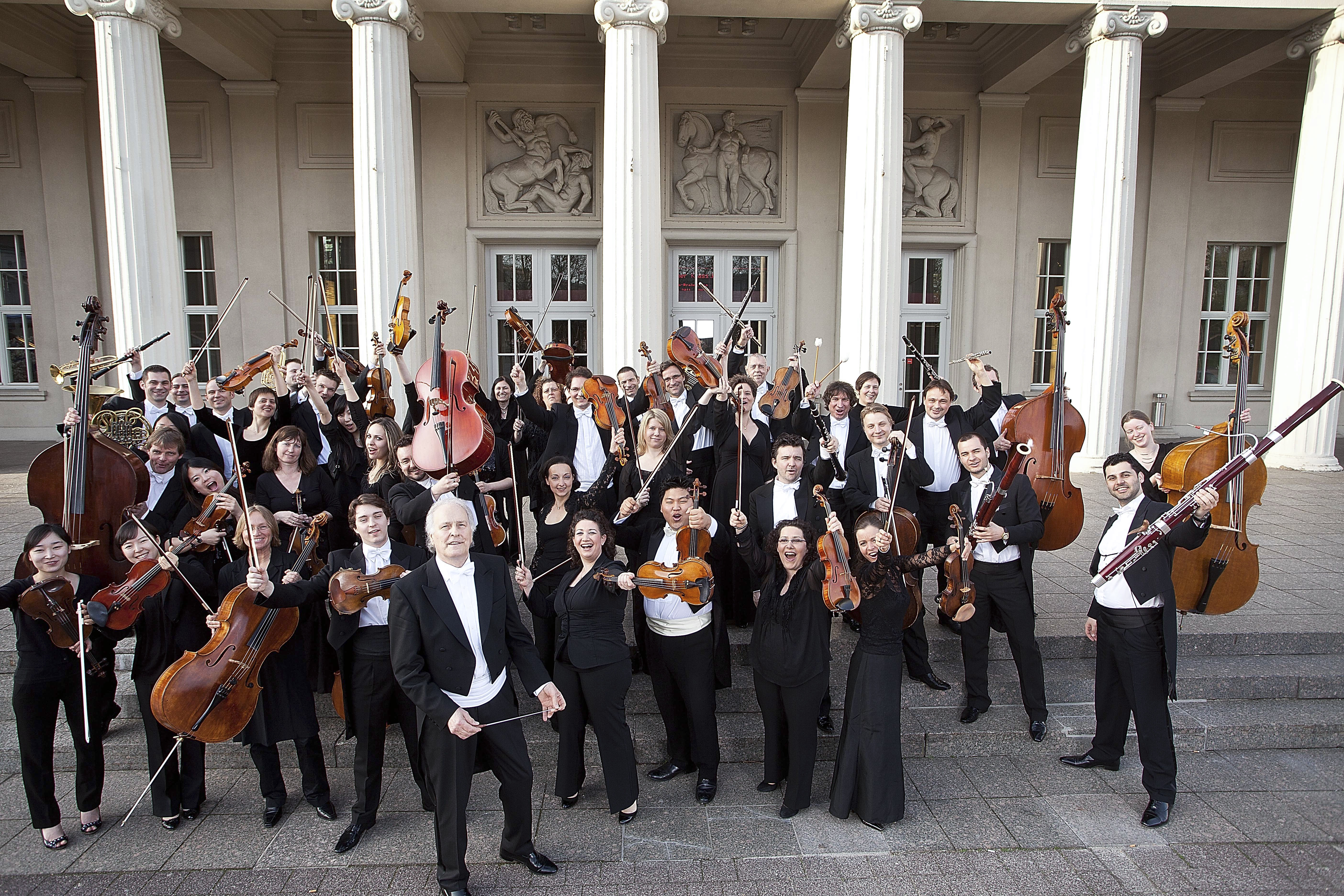
- Klassische Philharmonie Bonn in 2011
- Former name: Chur Cölnisches Orchester
- Founded: 1986
- Location: Bonn, North Rhine-Westphalia, Germany
- Principal conductor: 1986 – 2021: Heribert Beissel
- Website: www.klassische-philharmonie-bonn.de

Klassische Philharmonie Bonn (Classical philharmonic Bonn) is a German touring symphony orchestra, based in Bonn, North Rhine-Westphalia. It was founded by Heribert Beissel in 1986, derived from the Chur Cölnisches Orchester that he had founded in 1959 to perform music played originally at the Bonn court of the Electors of Cologne. Beissel conducted the orchestra until his death in 2021. They have regularly played a concert series Wiener Klassik at more than ten concert halls in Germany, and also toured in Europe, the U.S. and Japan.

== History ==
Heribert Beissel, conductor at the Bonn Opera, founded an instrumental ensemble in 1959 in order to focus on music originally played at the court of the Electors of Cologne in Bonn. It was called Chur Cölnisches Orchester and Chur Cölnisches Solistenensemble. Expanding the group, he founded the Klassische Philharmonie Bonn in 1968. As of 2021, it has around 60 players. They often perform with the Chur Cölnischer Chor Bonn in works for choir and orchestra. From 1991 to 2001, the orchestra was sponsored by the Deutsche Telekom.

After Beissel's death on 11 June 2021, concertmaster Ervis Gega, who played in the orchestra for 20 years, announced that she would continue, leading the group in his spirit.

== Wiener Klassik ==
Beissel and the orchestra ran a series Wiener Klassik, focused on music from the classical period. Concerts have been played in the Bonn region as part of the Poppelsdorfer Schloßkonzerte festival at Schloss Poppelsdorf, the Redoute in Bad Godesberg and at the Beethovenhalle, including a traditional New Year's concert. Regular venues of the series also include:

- Liederhalle in Stuttgart
- Meistersingerhalle in Nürnberg
- Herkulessaal in Munich
- Kongresszentrum Karlsruhe
- Landesfunkhaus in Hanover
- Die Glocke in Bremen
- Rudolf-Oetker-Halle in Bielefeld
- Konzerthaus Berlin
- Laeiszhalle in Hamburg
- Kurhaus, Wiesbaden
- Kurhaus, Bad Neuenahr

The orchestra played several recordings. They toured to the U.S., Japan, Singapore, to Belgium, France, Italy, the Netherlands, Spain and the UK, and at festivals including the Bregenz Festival and the Schleswig-Holstein Musik Festival.

On the occasion of Beissel's 80th birthday in 2013, they performed Haydn's Harmoniemesse in B-flat major and Bruckner's Symphony No. 7 at the Beethovenhalle.

== Young players ==
The orchestra understands its function as an Orchesterakademie, an academy training young players at major concert halls. They offered accompaniment on a concert tour to recipients of first prizes of the Internationaler Mozartwettbewerb Salzburg of the Mozarteum in the 2011/12 season.

== Recordings ==
Beissel and the Klassische Philharmonie Bonn recorded live piano concertos by Mozart, No. 12 in A major and No. 9 in E-flat major, with soloist Ekaterina Litvintseva in 2013. A reviewer noted about the orchestra of 23 players for the occasion: "The splendid Klassische Philharmonie Bonn is a model of consistency: enthusiastic and dedicated". They recorded the First Piano Concerto by Johannes Brahms live in 2017, with Ekaterina Litvintseva as the soloist. A reviewer noted the orchestra's transparent, lean sound, and summarised that they "typically play with spirit and great sensitivity to the emotional and intellectual flow of the music".
