= Freiburg Cathedral Boys' Choir =

German Choir

The Freiburg Cathedral Boys' Choir (German: Freiburger Domsingknaben) is one ensemble of the "Freiburg Cathedral Music" in southwest Germany, which has a history that can be traced back over eight centuries. It was directed by Boris Böhmann and composed of about 55 boys and 25 adult voices.

== Historical overview ==
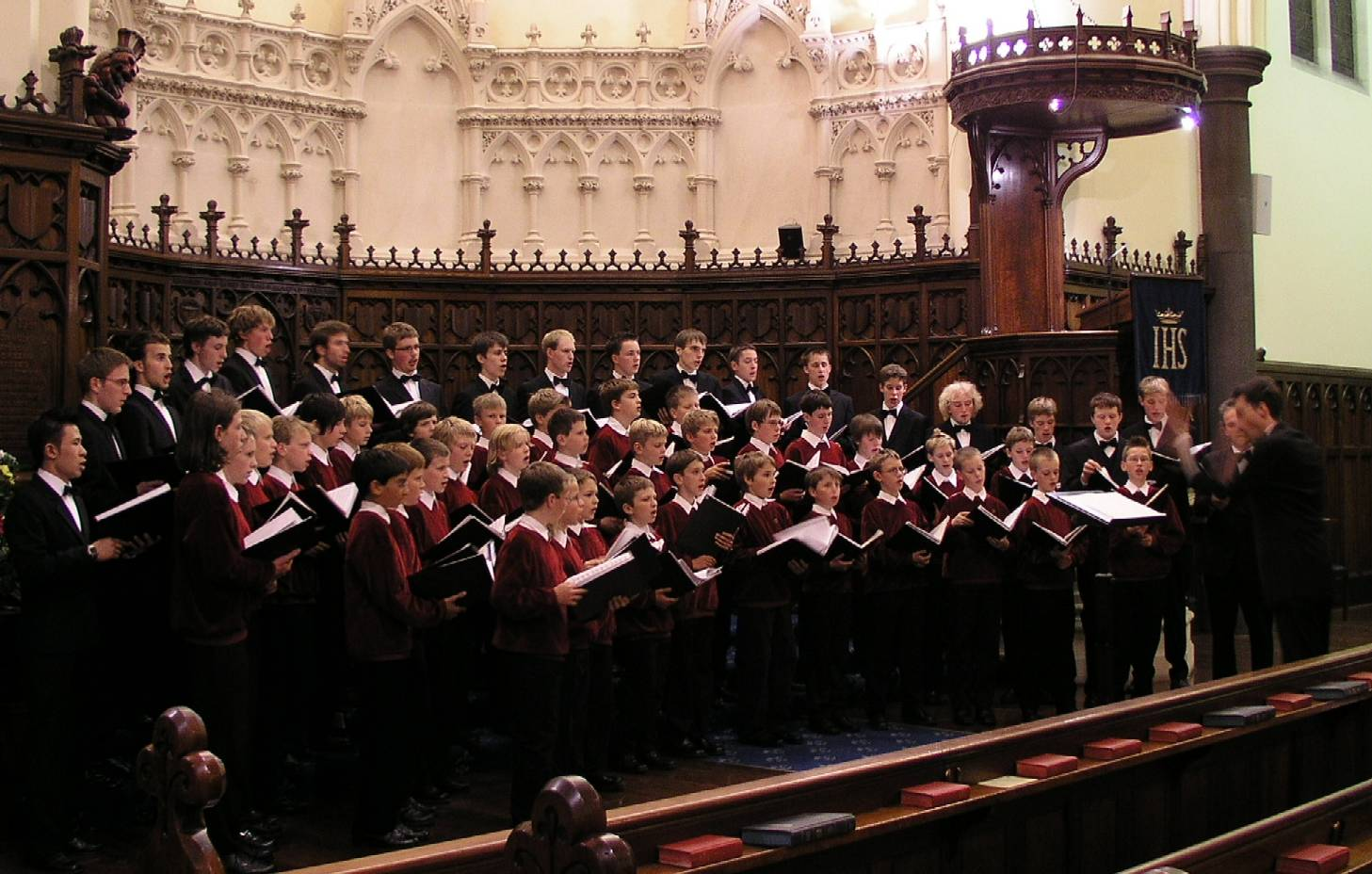
Freiburg Cathedral Boys' Choir – Concert tour 2006, Australia

As early as the 13th century, there is evidence of a Latin school that played an important role in the formation of choral music at the Freiburg Cathedral. Since the 16th century, polyphonic music for the boys’ choir at the cathedral has been passed down in written form.

The boys sang at early mass, at vespers, and on Sundays and holidays, often together with the Cathedral Chamber Choir, into the 20th century. During the Nazi regime, the choirs were dissolved, only to be officially reinstated on the Feast of All Saints in 1970. This was accomplished by the director of music and prelate, Dr. Raimund Hug, whose 30-year direction brought new international acclaim to the choir. Since the 1970s, the Boys’ Choir has been responsible for Sunday and feast day masses at the cathedral.

The choir has performed in spiritual and secular concerts under conductors such as Lorin Maazel, Michael Gielen, Neville Creed, Philippe Herreweghe, Ingo Metzmacher, Roland Bader and Moshe Atzmon. For its musical achievements, the choir has received various honours and awards. Concert tours have taken the Freiburg Cathedral Boys’ Choir throughout Germany and Europe as well as to Canada, Japan, South America, South Africa and Australia. In 2003, conductor Boris Böhmann assumed the artistic direction of the Freiburg Cathedral Music, and has continued the tradition of a Boys’ Choir at the archiepiscopal chair in Freiburg. The choir has produced various CDs of a cappella and oratorio works as well as many radio and television productions.

== Musical training ==
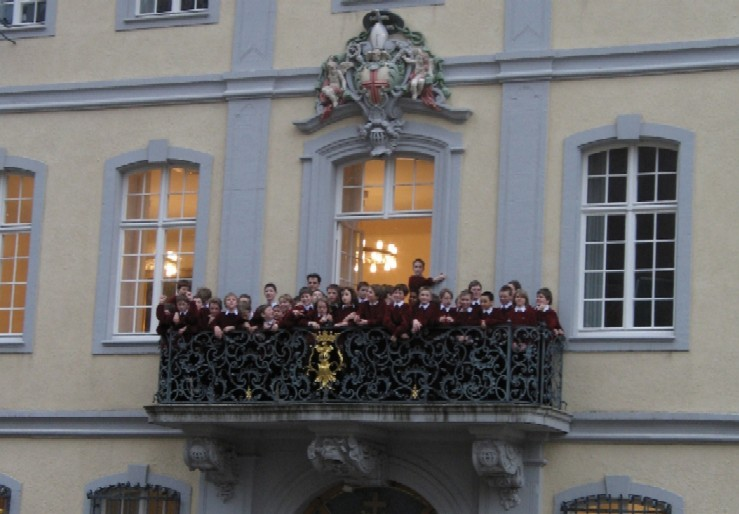
Freiburg Cathedral Boys' Choir – Archbishop's Palace Freiburg, Germany

The musical education and promotion of young singers has its home in the Archbishop's Palace, directly across from the cathedral in Freiburg. This historical residence of the Freiburg bishops was completely renovated in 1995, and has since become an institution of the Freiburg Cathedral Music, known as the Freiburg Cathedral Choir School.

Before a youngster of 10 years of age is accepted into the Boys’ Chamber Choir, he must complete musical training including individual voice lessons, choir stages (Early Education, Pre-Choir, A-Choir, Chamber Choir), and music theory. After having passed the entrance examination under the choir director, the singer receives a small Cathedral cross which symbolizes his complete affiliation with the Freiburg Cathedral Boys’ Choir. The men's voices consist of experienced former choir boys who are further instructed after the change of voice. According to the englisch model they sing also the alto part, which is singular in Germany. Apart from choir training, music-theory and individual voice lessons, the children and adolescents can also receive various instrumental lessons at the school. Freiburg's Cathedral Choir School (over 600 members) is a prominent training centre for choir and church music in Germany and promotes musically talented children and adolescents and their early musical formation.

== Discography ==
- H. W. Henze: Das Floß der Medusa (2017)
- J. S. Bach: Mass in B minor (2016)
- J. S. Bach: St. Matthew Passion (2016)
- G. Faurè: Requiem (2015)
- Freiburger Domsingknaben LIVE (2015)
- J. S. Bach: St. John Passion (2010)
- W. A. Mozart: Requiem (2006)
- G.F. Händel: Dixit Dominus (2005)
- J. Haydn: Stabat Mater (2004)
- W. A. Mozart: Requiem (2003)
- Celebrations of the Church Year – Choir and Organ Pieces (2003)
- Baroque Christmas Concert from the Cathedral in Freiburg (DVD, 2002)
- Festive Music from Benedictan Monasteries of South-Western Germany (2002)
- Sax’n Dom – Children's Songs (2002)
- J.B. Bach: St. Matthew Passion (2001)
- J. G. Rheinberger: The Star of Bethlehem (2001)
- Ave Maria – Songs of Mary (2000)
- G. Mahler: Symphony No. 3 (1997)
- Rejoice, Heavenly Queen (1997)
- Where One Sings: Popular Melodies with the Freiburg Cathedral Boys’ Choir (1996)
- Jesus is Born: The Saviour of the World (1994)
- Jubilate Deo – Festive Motettes of the Church Year (1994)
- For Unto Us a Child is Born – Christmas with the Freiburg Cathedral Boys’ Choir (1994)
- Masses by M. Haydn and J. G. Albrechtsberger (1991)

== See also ==
- Boris Böhmann
- List of choirs
