= Egyptischer Marsch =

Austrian March

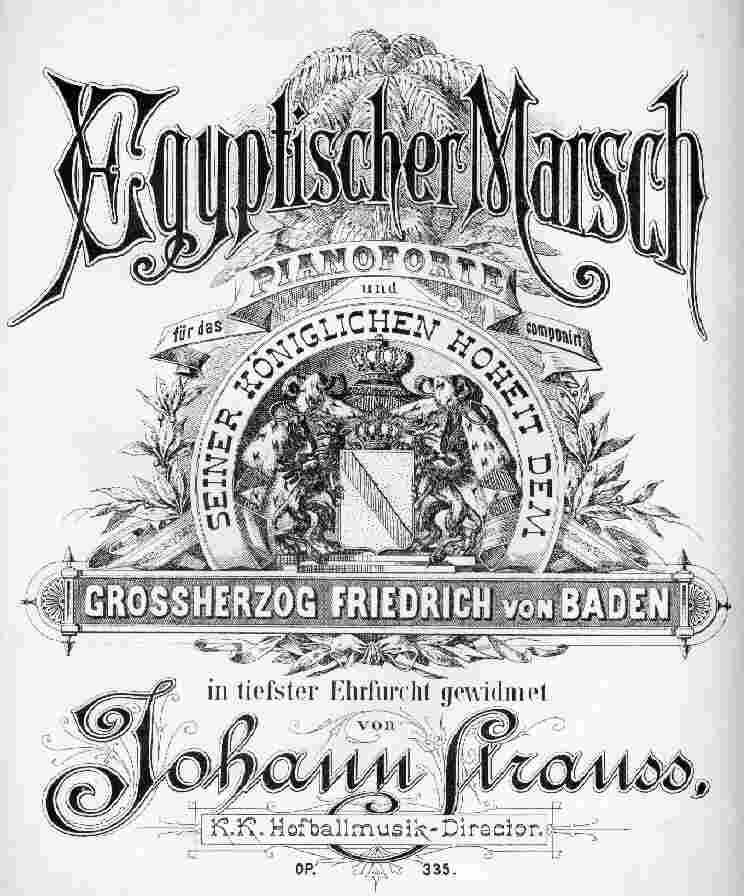
Title page of piano score

Egyptischer Marsch (Egyptian March), Op. 335, is a march composed by Johann Strauss II. It was commissioned for the inauguration of the Suez Canal, celebrated on 17 November 1869 in Port Said, where Emperor Franz Joseph I of Austria officiated at the ceremonial opening, though it was first performed on 6 July 1869 in Pavlovsk, Saint Petersburg, under the title "Tscherkessen-Marsch" (March of the Circassians). Strauss later dedicated the work to Frederick I, Grand Duke of Baden.

In musical terms, Johann Strauss' "Egyptian March" has been described as a "representative example of an" alla turca "composition... characterised by melodic arabesques and metric syncopations".

== Instrumentation ==
The piece is scored for piccolo, flute, two oboes, two clarinets in A, two bassoons, four horns in F, two trumpets in F, three trombones, glockenspiel, triangle, tambourine, snare drum, bass drum, cymbals, voices, and strings.
