= Folkwang Kammerorchester Essen =

German chamber orchestra

- Chamber orchestra
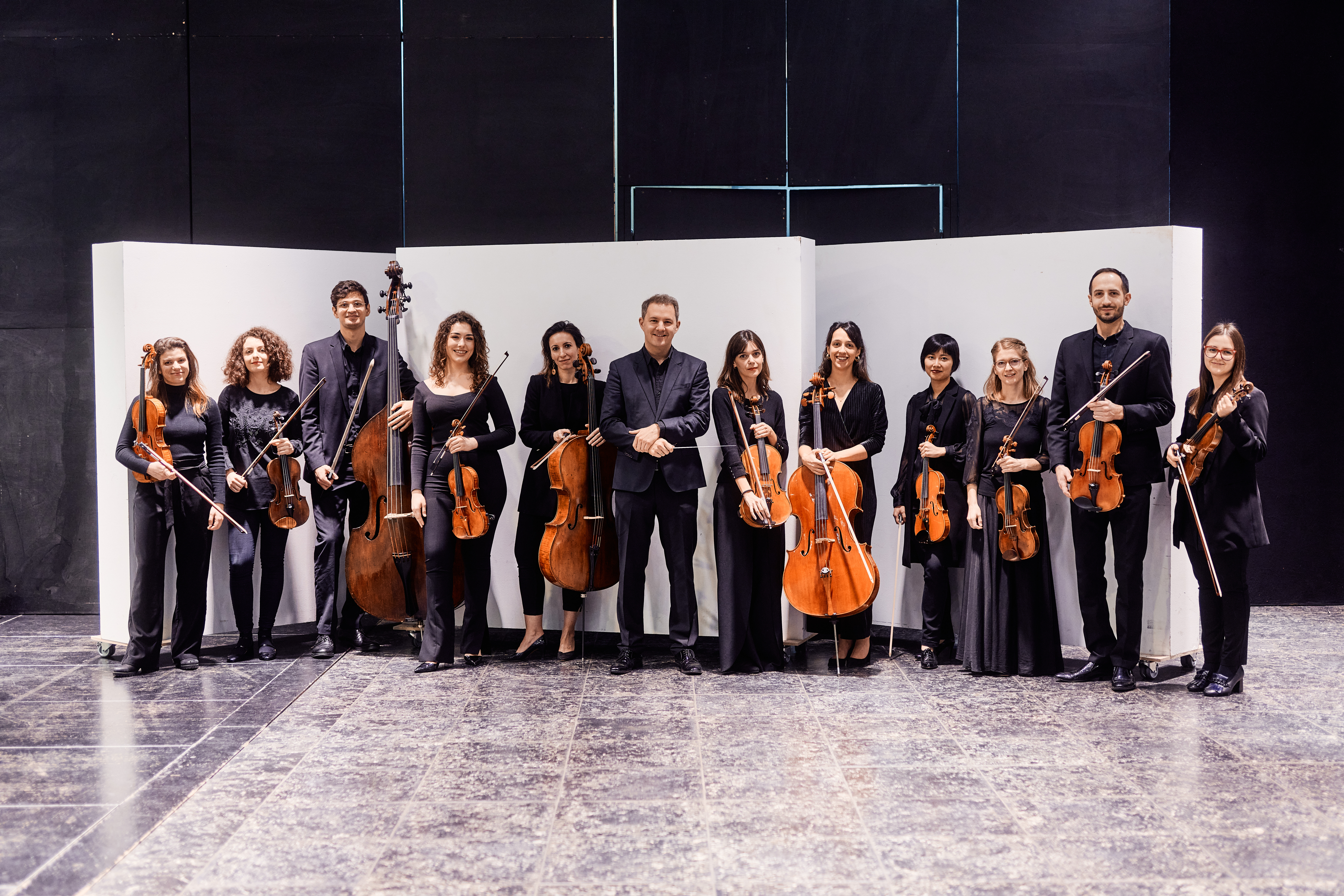
- Hall of the Villa Hügel where the orchestra traditionally performs
- Founded: 1958 by Heinz Dressel
- Location: Essen, Germany
- Principal conductor: Johannes Klumpp
- Website: www.folkwang-kammerorchester.de

The Folkwang Kammerorchester Essen is a chamber orchestra historically formed mostly by students of the Folkwang University in Essen, Germany, and other Musikhochschulen in North Rhine-Westphalia, to prepare them for a future position in an orchestra; however, it currently employs a core of permanent members from all over Germany and the world. Members are auditioned and trialed as in a professional orchestra, and, if successful, are offered a permanent contract up to the age of 35. It was founded in 1958 by the director of the Folkwangschule Heinz Dressel. More than 500 musicians were since employed in opera- and symphony orchestras in Germany and abroad.

The orchestra is the only one to perform regularly in the historic Villa Hügel. Young soloists have been chosen to also enjoy a stage for their performances. Artists such as Christoph Eschenbach, Maria Kliegel, Nils Mönkemeyer, Sabine Meyer, Vadim Repin and Christian Tetzlaff appeared with the orchestra early in their career. The orchestra has played also in Germany and Europe, including Austria, Italy, Lithuania, Switzerland. A 2010 tour led to Algeria. They have performed at festivals such as Rheingau Musik Festival, Schleswig-Holstein Musik Festival and Schwetzinger Mozartfest. The orchestra is a regular partner of the Essener Bachchor and has accompanied other choirs such as the Rheingauer Kantorei. Guest conductors have included Marc Piollet, Peter Schneider and Lothar Zagrosek. In 2015, the orchestra played a charity concert at the Aachen Cathedral. In the 2016/17 season, the orchestra scheduled concerts also in the Zeche Zollverein.

Dressel was the first chief conductor, succeeded by Heribert Beissel, Alexander Schwinck, Karl-Heinz Bloemeke, Stefan Fraas and Achim Fiedler (from 2006). The current chief conductor, Johannes Klumpp, has held the position from 2013.
