= Johannes Klumpp =

German conductor

Johannes Klumpp (born 17 December 1980) is a German conductor.

== Life ==
Born in Stuttgart, Klumpp went to school at the Eberhard-Ludwigs-Gymnasium, completing with the Abitur. After private conducting lessons from Manfred Schreier and Thomas Ungar, he studied conducting at the Hochschule für Musik Franz Liszt, Weimar, with Nicolas Pasquet and Gunter Kahlert. He also studied viola with Frank Strauch.

In 2009, Klumpp became principal conductor of the Musiktheater im Revier in Gelsenkirchen. Since 2013, he has been chief conductor of the Folkwang Kammerorchester Essen. As a guest conductor, he has worked with the Düsseldorfer Symphoniker, the Tiroler Landesorchester Innsbruck, the WDR Rundfunkorchester Köln, the Russian Philharmonic Orchestra, the Dresdner Philharmonie, the Landesjugendorchester Berlin the Nürnberger Symphoniker and the Nordwestdeutsche Philharmonie, amongst others.

Klumpp has been conductor of the SommerMusikAkademie Schloss Hundisburg since 2007, and in 2013, he also became the Artistic Director of the Artistic festival in Saxony-Anhalt, together with pianist Rolf-Dieter Arens.

== Awards ==
In 2006, Johannes Klumpp received the Weimarian "Franz-Liszt Prize". By participating in the final round of the international conducting competition in Besançon, he was brought into the international spotlight for the first time. In 2008, he won the first prize and the special prize for accompanied conducting at the German university competition (Hochschulwettbewerb) "in memoriam Herbert von Karajan". In 2010, he received the Herrmann-Hildebrandt scholarship, and in 2011, he won the special prize at the German conducting competition.

In the years from 2005 to 2011, Johannes Klumpp was awarded the highest support level of the Dirigentenforum of the German Music Council (Deutscher Musikrat).

== Recordings ==
In cooperation with the classic label Ars-Produktion, he published CDs and SA-CDs with works from composers such as Wolfgang Amadeus Mozart, Johann Nepomuk Hummel, Carl Maria von Weber and Ignaz Pleyel. "Northern Lights", the newest production published in 2014, includes Scandinavian composers.
