= Heinz Dressel =

German conductor

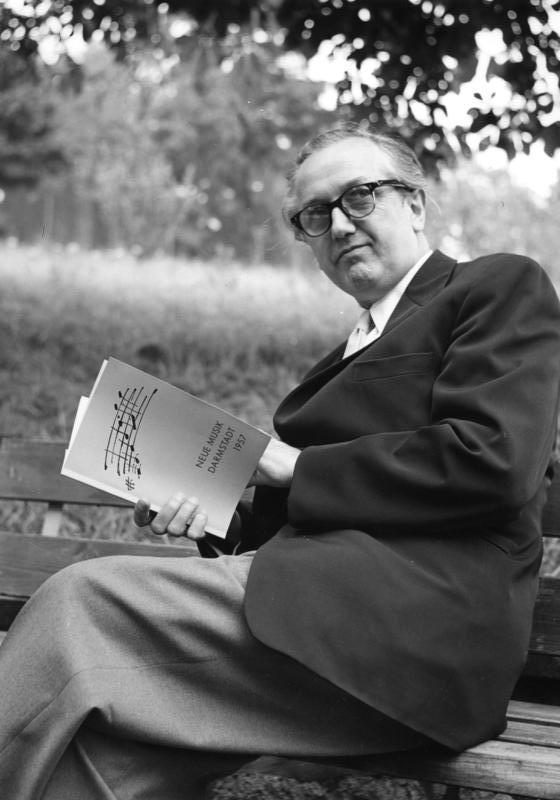
Heinz Dressel (1957)

Heinz Dressel (23 June 1902 – June 1997) was a German conductor.

== Life ==
Born in Mainz, Dressel studied in Cologne with Hermann Abendroth, became Kapellmeister in Plauen, and later in Lübeck and general music director there in 1934. During the period of National Socialism, he conducted the 1934 premiere of Hugo Distler's setting of the Thingspiel Ewiges Deutschland by Wolfram Brockmeier.

He was general music director in Münster Symphony Orchestra from 1941/42 to 1951, then in Freiburg im Breisgau (1951–1956) and later in Essen. Dressel was furthermore director of the Folkwang University in Essen from 1956, taking over the conducting class, the orchestra and the opera department there himself (the opera department only until 1958). Dressel founded the Folkwang Kammerorchester Essen in 1958. From 1964 to 1968 he was president of the Deutscher Musikrat.

Dressel died in Essen.

== Honours ==
- 1969: Order of Merit of the Federal Republic of Germany
- 1989: Order of Merit of North Rhine-Westphalia.
