= Elza Kolodin =

Polish pianist

Elza Kolodin is a pianist from Poland. She studied in Kraków, Warsaw and Paris.

She has gained much acclaim from the international press, who have described her "rapturous playing" as being distinguished by "brilliant virtuosity" and a very "personal mixture of electrifying energy and profound poetry".

Elza Kolodin began her pianistic career at the Special School for Music in Kraków under Zofia Zagajewska. After being granted a scholarship from the Chopin Society, she continued her studies at the Music Academy in Warsaw under Ryszard Bakst and Zbigniew Drzewiecki.

After her emigration, the Foundation Albert Roussel enabled her to complete her studies at the Ecole Normale de Musique in Paris in the class of Thierry de Brunhoff a master pupil of Alfred Cortot. She graduated with the highest distinction, the "Licence de concert a l'unanimite du jury".

During the course of her career, Elza Kolodin has enjoyed much success in the competition arena, having won 3rd Prize at the Concorso Pianistico Internazionale Ferruccio Busoni (1973), 2nd Prizes at the Concorso Pianistico Internazionale Alessandro Casagrande (1972) and the Concurso Internacional Maria Canals (1976) as well as 1st Prizes at what must have been some of the highlights of her career, the Premio Internacional de Musica de Jaen (1973), Concurso Internacional de Piano Reina Sofia (1977), and Concurso Internacional de Piano Jose Iturbi (1981), where she also took home prizes for the best interpretation of Spanish music.

Her concerts have taken her to the music capitals of Europe, Japan and the USA and she has also released several recordings under the labels Ars Musici and EMI.

Alongside her concert activities, Elza Kolodin is also a dedicated teacher and is a professor at the Hochschule für Musik Freiburg im Breisgau, Germany, where she has been residing since 1976.

She conducts master classes regularly in various countries and is also a jury member of many international competitions.

Record of prizes
Year	Competition	Prize
1972	(Italy) Concorso Pianistico Internazionale Alessandro Casagrande	2nd prize
1973	(Italy) Concorso Pianistico Internazionale Ferruccio Busoni	3rd prize (ex-aequo)
1973	(Spain) Premio Internacional de Música de Jaén	1st prize (ex-aequo)
1976	(Spain) Concurso Internacional de Piano María Canals	2nd prize
1977	(Spain) Concurso Internacional de Piano Reina Sofia	1st prize
1981	(Spain) Concurso Internacional de Piano José Iturbi	1st prize

== See also ==
- Moye Kolodin
