= Aarno Karhilo =

Finnish diplomat

Aarno Eino Karhilo (until 1936 Grönlund; 22 March 1927 Helsinki – 3 September 2008 Helsinki) was a Finnish diplomat who served as Ambassador since 1971. He has a Bachelor of Law .

Karhilo was Ambassador of Finland to Tokyo and Manila from 1971 to 1972, Permanent Representative to the United Nations in New York from 1971 to 1977, Ambassador to Paris and Permanent Representative to Unesco from 1977 to 1982, Ambassador to Moscow in 1983– 1988 and the Political Undersecretary of State for the Ministry of Foreign Affairs 1988–1992.
