= Christoph Wyneken =

German violinist and conductor

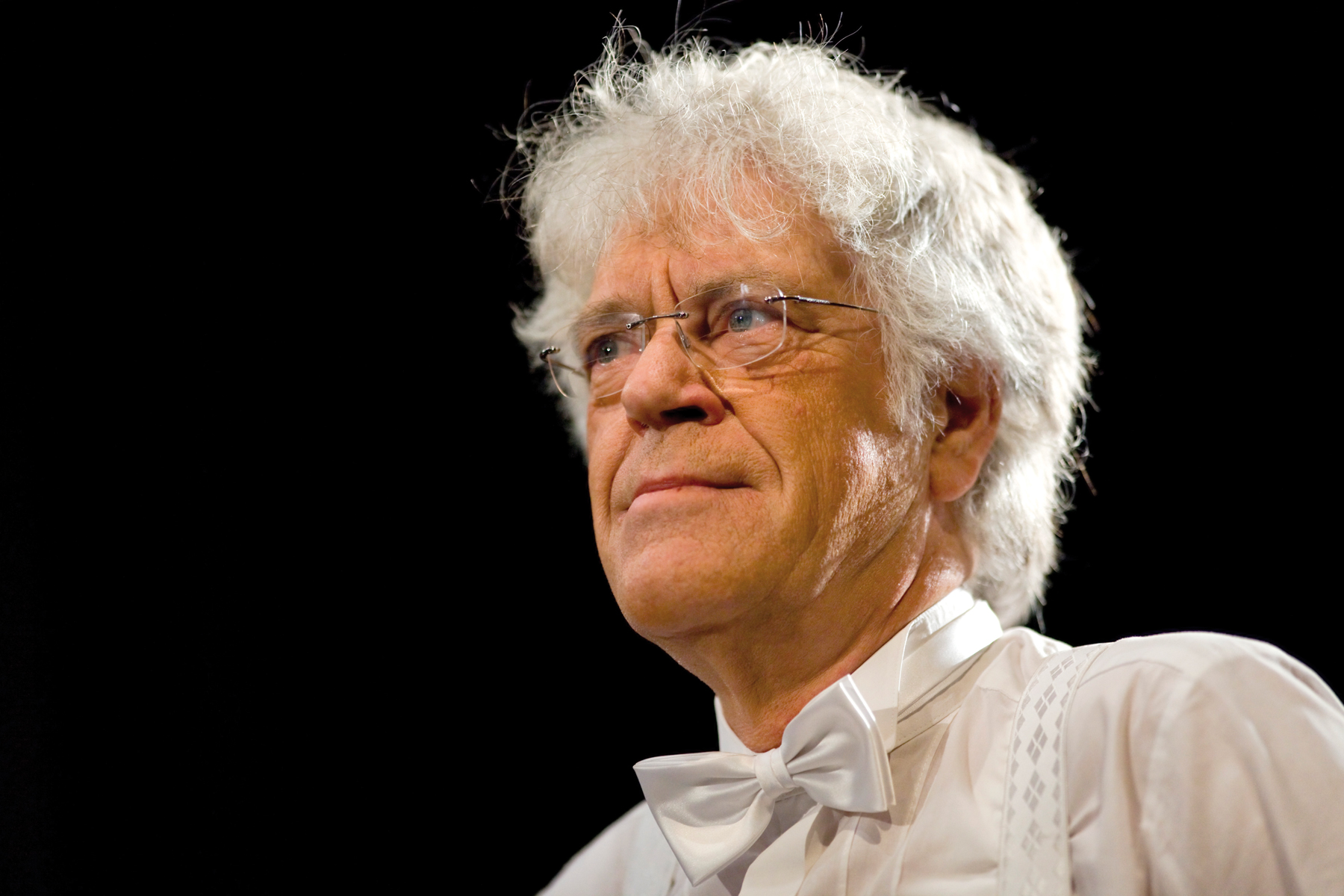
Christoph Wyneken

Christoph Wyneken (born 1941) is a German violinist and conductor.

== Life and career ==
Born in Berlin, Wyneken studied violin and conducting at the music academies of Berlin University of the Arts, Hochschule für Musik Detmold and Austin.

As a violinist he played with the Deutsches Symphonie-Orchester Berlin, with the Berliner Philharmonic and as first concertmaster of the NDR Radiophilharmonie. Wyneken had a teaching position for chamber music/violin at the Hochschule für Musik Freiburg.

Wyneken's commitment to promoting young talent and as conductor of the Landesjugendorchester Baden-Württemberg was honoured in 2003 with the Order of Merit of the Federal Republic of Germany.

A cooperation links Wyneken with music academies in Germany, Japan, Poland and the United States. He was a visiting professor at the "Musashino" music academy in Tokyo and led concert projects of the university orchestra with subsequent concert tours through the music centres of Japan. In Bangkok, Wyneken conducted projects of the South East Asian student orchestra SAYOWE. Since the 2010s, Wyneken has been a lecturer at the Idyllwild Festival in Los Angeles.

In 2009, he accepted an invitation to the University of Southern California in Los Angeles for the first time. Wyneken conducts both professional and student and youth orchestras. He has conducted with the professional orchestras of the NDR Hanover Radio Philharmonic, the Berner Sinfonieorchester, the Staatskapelle Halle, the Breslauer Philharmoniker, the Stuttgarter Philharmoniker, the Stuttgarter Kammerorchester, and the Silesian Philharmony.
