= Stephan König =

German composer and jazz pianist

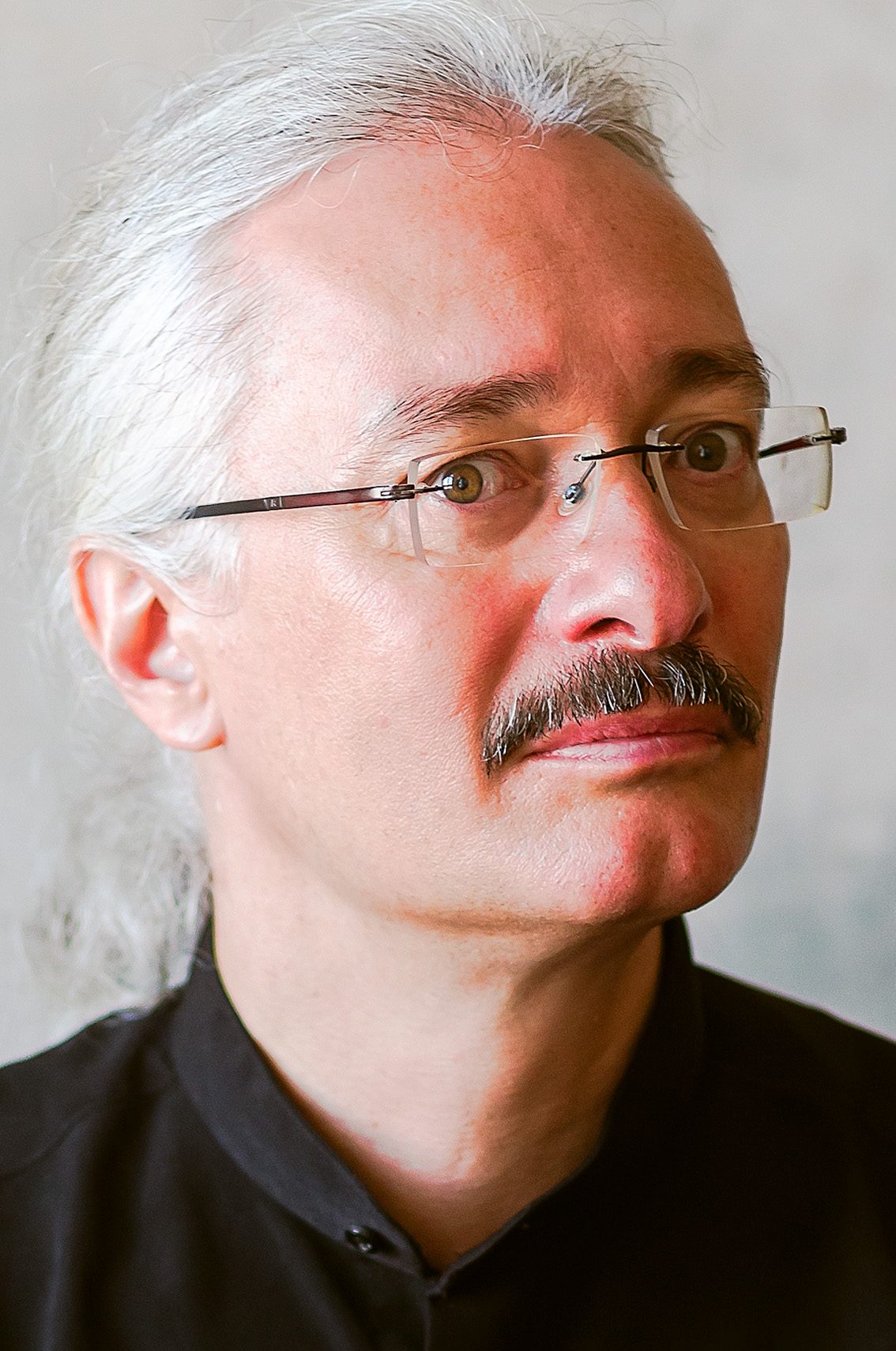
Stephan König (October 2018)

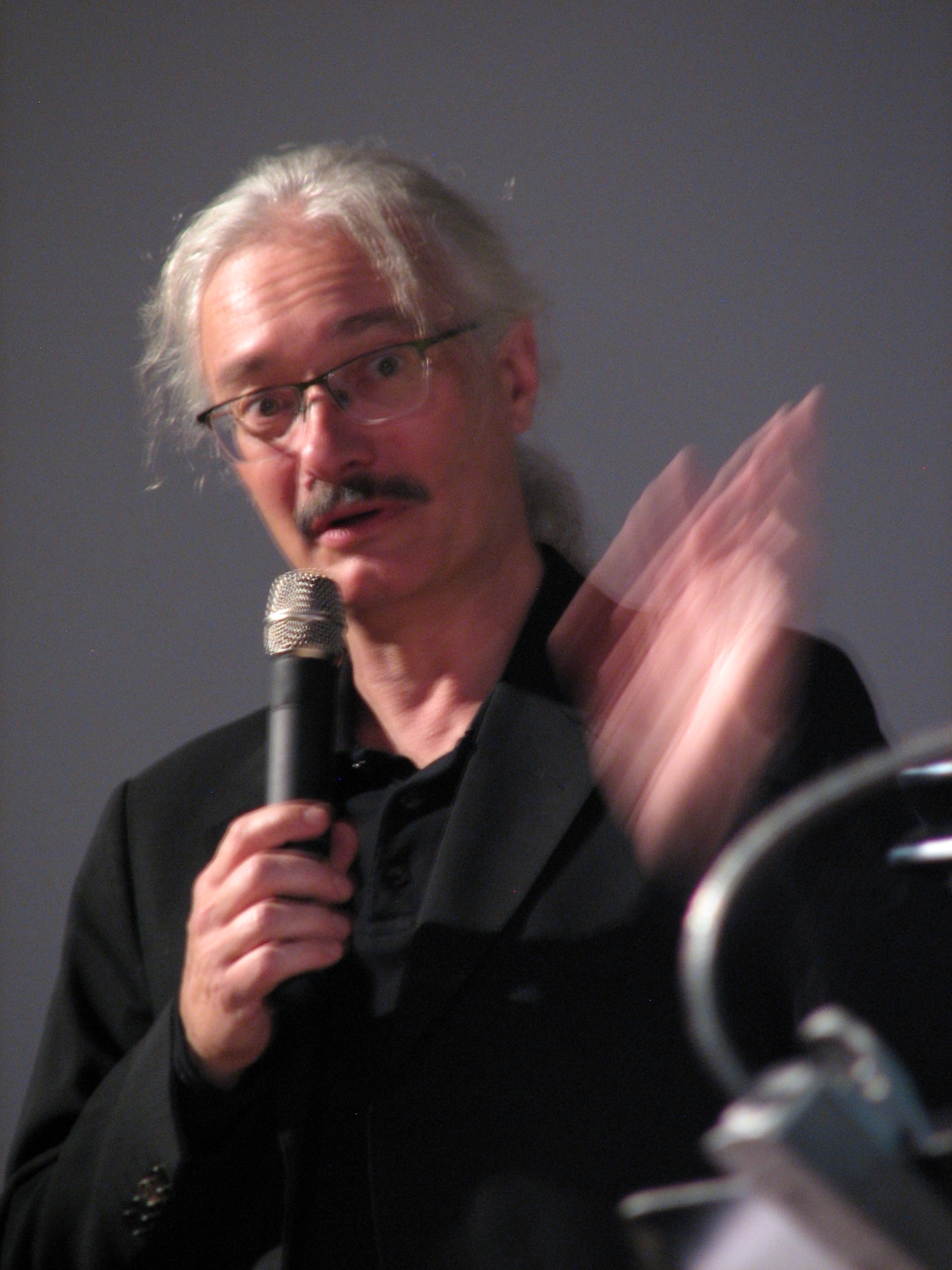
Stephan König (September 2018)

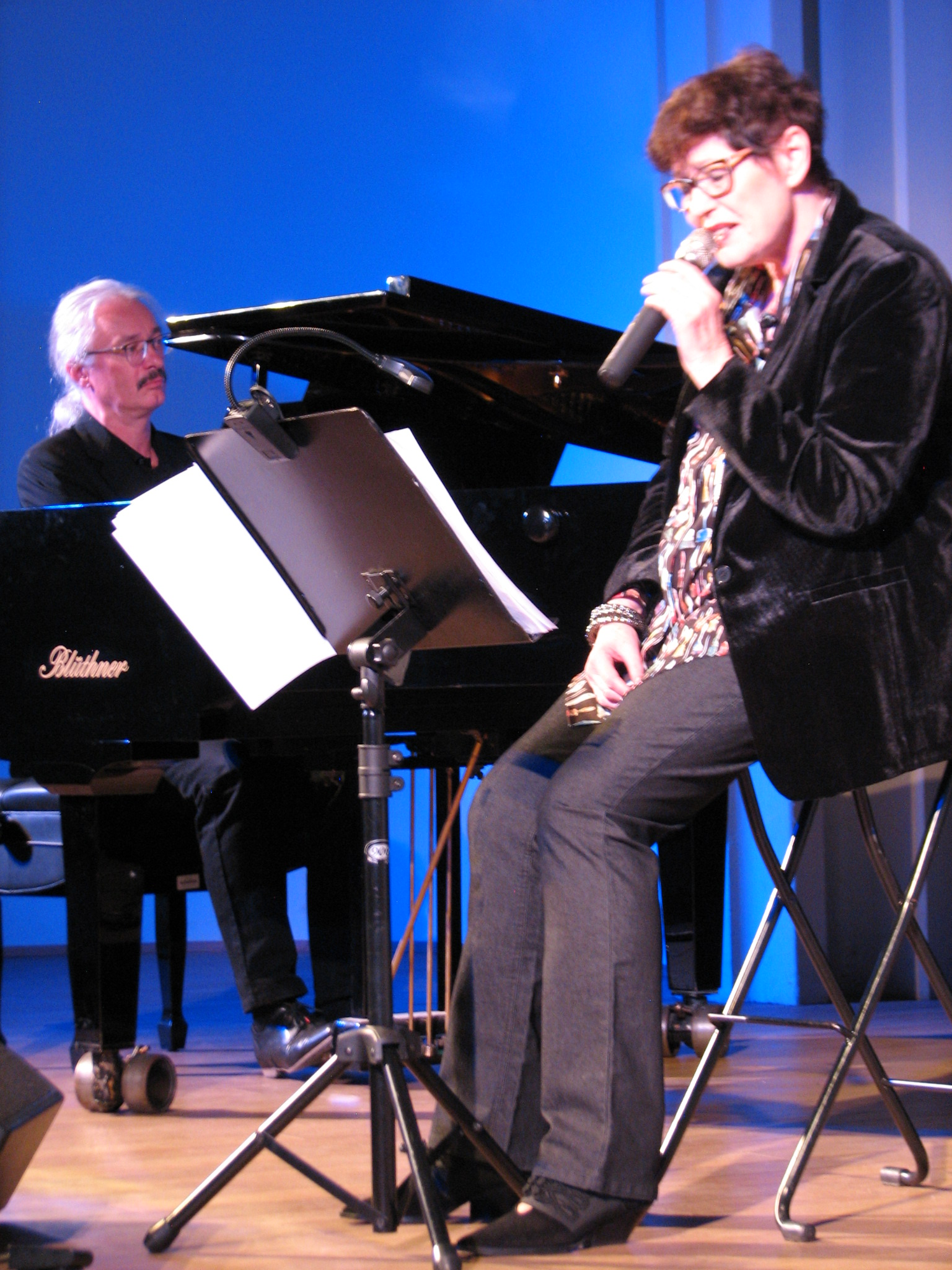
Stephan König and Uschi Brüning (September 2018)

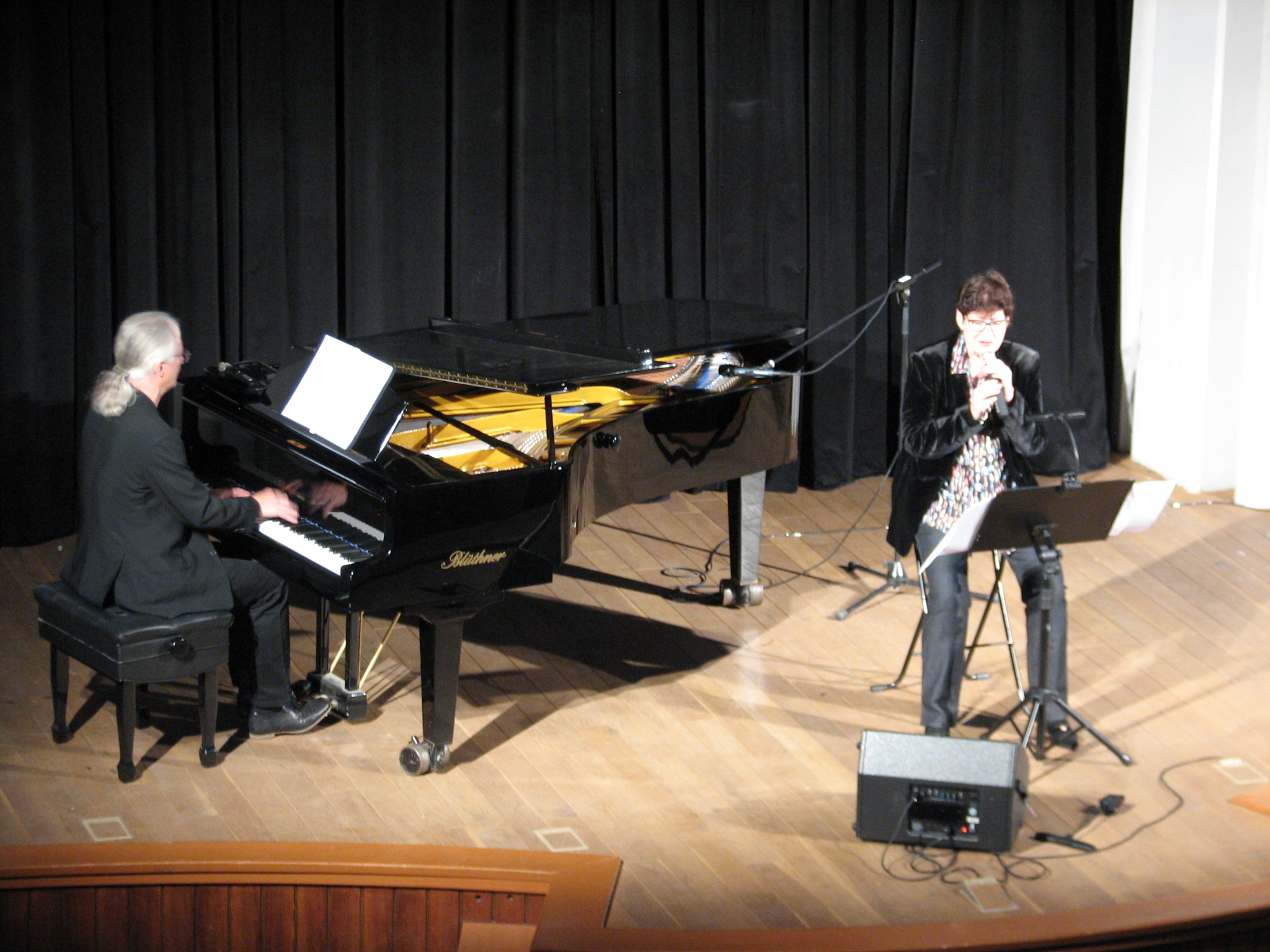
Stephan König in concert with Uschi Brüning (Grimma, Gymnasium St. Augustine, 14 September 2018)

Stephan König (born 4 October 1963) is a German composer, pianist and conductor. He is the musical director of the "LeipJAZZig-Orkester" and the chamber orchestra "artentfaltung" and is considered one of the most authoritative Jazz musicians in Leipzig.

== Life ==
König was born in Berlin in 1963. After six years of music school lessons in Magdeburg, König was a pupil at the Spezialschule für Musik in Halle from 1974 to 1980. In 1980, he began studying at the University of Music and Theatre Leipzig, majoring in conducting (Olaf Koch and Christian Kluttig), piano (Wolfram Merkel) and composition (Peter Herrmann) and graduated in 1986 in all three subjects. He then completed additional studies in composition at the same university until 1988. Since the same year, he has held a teaching position at the university. In the field of jazz/popular music he currently teaches jazz piano and piano.

In 1985, he made a guest appearance as harpsichordist of the Halle Opera House in Poland. In 1986, he was a founding member of the Leipzig Jazz Theatre, of which he was musical director for two years.

In 1987, the pianist founded the König Trio together with Thomas Moritz (double bass) and Jörg Steffens (drums). After changing line-ups (among others with Stephan "Grete" Weiser, Tom Götze, Wolfram Dix, Frank-Endrik Moll), he currently plays with Thomas Stahr (double bass) and Wieland Götze (drums). The trio performed among others at the Vilnius Jazz Festival (1988) and at the Sibiu Jazz Festival (1990). In 2010, he formed a jazz quartet, which also includes Reiko Brockelt (saxophone). This ensemble covers a range between classical and jazz. In 2018, they played a jazz version of the Christmas Oratorio in the Herkulessaal in Munich. In duo, König appeared with Fermín Villanueva (violoncello).

In 1995, he was one of the initiators of the gast-art series at the Schauspiel Leipzig, which he supervised as artistic director. In 1996, he co-initiated the LeipJAZZig event series at Leipzig's Nikolaischule. In 1997, he became a board member of the Initiative Leipziger Jazzmusiker.

In 1998, he founded the LeipJAZZig Orchestra, which he leads and to which fourteen jazz soloists belong. It has performed among others at the Leipziger Jazztage (1999, 2006), the Internationales Jazzfestival Münster (2006), the Nanjing Jazz Festival (2007) and the Jazztage Görlitz (2010). In 2017, it played in the Elbphilharmonie in Hamburg. Jürgen Wölfer compared the group to the Vienna Art Orchestra. Bert Noglik describes the LeipJAZZig-Orkester as a "Kultband".

From 1999 to 2008, he was artistic director of JazzKosmos. In 2007, the chamber orchestra "artentfaltung" was founded by him and the painter and graphic artist Christl Maria Göthner, of which he is artistic director. From 2008 to 2014, he was a permanent pianist in the Figaro Radio or Figaro Reading Café on MDR Figaro. In the 2010s, he repeatedly played the piano and keyboard with the MDR Leipzig Radio Symphony Orchestra. Furthermore, he worked among others with Nigel Kennedy, Lyambiko, Florian Poser and the Ensemble Amarcord.

Guest contracts exist with various orchestras and stages. Concert tours have taken him at home and abroad. König has been involved in several CD, radio and television productions. His œuvre includes orchestral, chamber and vocal music, jazz as well as music theatre and drama. He has received commissions among others by the Gewandhaus, the Leipzig Opera, the Akademisches Orchester Leipzig, the Mitteldeutscher Rundfunk and the Thomanerchor Leipzig. König was responsible for numerous arrangements, for example his version for voice and string quartet of the song cycle The Juliet Letters (by Elvis Costello) was premiered in 2009 by Ines Agnes Krautwurst and the Leipzig String Quartet.

Three times a year, the Augustinian Association of the Gymnasium St. Augustine in Grimma organises the Augustinian Concerts, for which König is musically responsible. In the 32nd series of the Augustinian Concerts, König performed the programme "Herzenslieder" with Uschi Brüning on 14 September 2018, which he prepared together with the singer.

Hagen Kunze and Peter Korfmacher called König the "Jazz-Guru" of Leipzig.

== Awards ==
- 1976: Diploma (piano solo), Virtuosi per Musica di Pianoforte, Ústí nad Labem (ČSSR).
- 1977: 1st place piano group A and special prize, 8th Improvisation Competition, Weimar
- 1979: 2nd place Piano Group B, 10th Improvisation Competition Weimar
- 1981: 2nd prize piano group C and special prize, 11th Improvisation Competition Weimar
- 1982: 5th place piano group C, 12th Improvisation Competition Weimar
- 1983. 1st prize piano group C, 13th Improvisation Competition Weimar
- 1987: Prize of the Verband der Komponisten und Musikwissenschaftler der DDR, 9th Chansontage der DDR in Frankfurt/Oder
- 1992: Prize of the Verlag Neue Musik Berlin, 11th Tage des Chansons in Frankfurt/Oder

== Work ==
- Klaviertrio (1984)
- 3 Lieder nach Texten von Johann Christian Günther (1985)
- Toccata für Klavier (1985)
- Ballade für Orchester (1986)
- Leb wohl, Judas (1986)
- DEHNSUCHT (1987–1990)
- Raviolo (1987)
- Geisterfahrer (1987)
- Der Tod von Bessie Smith (1988)
- Marilyn Memories (1992)
- ZUSAMMENALLEIN (1994). Ballettmusik
- SPRINGSWING (1996)
- BILLARD (1996). Musical gemeinsam mit Lothar Bölck. Premiere: 29 May 2001 Leipzig (Eröffnung, Konzertsaal der Hochschule für Musik und Theater „Felix Mendelssohn Bartholdy“ Leipzig, director Rüdiger Evers)
- Konzert für Klavier und Orchester (1997). Premiere: 21 September 2009 Jena (Volkshaus Jena, Jenaer Philharmonie, Stephan König (piano), u. v. a. m., direction: Hans Rotman)
- Zyklus für Jazz-Orchester (1998)
- FROZEN MOMENTS (2000). Konzert für Klavier und Streichquartett. Premiere: 27 June 2000 Leipzig (Kuppelhalle am Augustusplatz Leipzig, Stephan König (piano), Leipzig String Quartet)
- SAXOPHONIE (2000)
- quadruple talk (2001)
- BOUNDLESS MUSIC (2001). Konzert für Jazz-Trio und Sinfonie-Orchester. Premiere: 28 May 2001 Leipzig (VI. Akademisches Konzert, Großer Saal, Gewandhaus, Akademisches Orchester Leipzig, Stephan König (piano), Stephan Weiser (Kontrabass), Wolfram Dix (Schlagzeug), conductor: Horst Förster)
- Schnittstelle (2001)
- tap it deep (2002)
- Nichtsfabrik (2002)
- 3 Winterlieder (2003)
- four flight pictures (2003)
- ZAUBERSPRÜCHE (2004)
- Konzert für Klavier und Jazz-Orchester (2005)
- Bläserquintett (2005)
- Amadeus' Klavier (2006). Ein musikalisches Theater in 2 Akten. Libretto: Philipp J. Neumann. Premiers: 18 June 2006 Leipzig (Großer Saal, Gewandhaus, GewandhausKinderchor, u. v. a. m., direction: Frank-Steffen Elster)
- Ballade für Jazz-Orchester (2006)
- Konzert für Klavier und Kammerorchester (2007)
- Die Beschwörung der Oper (2007). Kantate für gemischten Chor, Kinderchor, Orchester und Bigband. Text: Philipp J. Neumann. Premiere: 11. November 2007 Leipzig (Wiedereröffnung, Oper Leipzig, Leipziger Universitätschor, GewandhausKinderchor, Kinderchor der Oper Leipzig, BigBand und Jazzchor der Hochschule für Musik und Theater Leipzig, Leipziger Universitätsorchester, Leitung: Stephan König)
- nocturnal awaking (2008)
- Klang Auerbach (2009)
- 12 Préludes für Klavier (2009) – Jazzinspirierte Klangbilder. Premiere: 20 March 2010 Leipzig (Mediencampus Leipzig, Stephan König (piano))
- Rhythmic Contacts (2009)
- SCHILLER2009 (2009) – Friedrich Schiller zum 250. Geburtstag. Premiere: 10 November 2009 (Gewandhaus, Martin Petzold (singing), Ines Agnes Krautwurst (singing), Sebastian Ude (violin), Henry Schneider (viola), Wolfram Stephan (violoncello), Thomas Stahr (Kontrabass, Bassgitarre), Thomas Winkler (percussion), Stephan König (piano, Leitung, Videoprojektion))
- Duo für Kastagnetten und Klavier (2010)
- Ballade für Klavier und Kammerorchester (2010)
- elm & oak (2011)
- Rhapsodie für Riesengeige und Orchester (2011)
- Die Reise zum Mond (2012). Filmmusik zu A Trip to the Moon by Georges Méliès (1902). Premiere 1 June 2012 Leipzig (Reihe Eins: Reise-Geschichten, MDR-Kubus, artentfaltung)
- Flux alabastrum (2013)
- LUCID DREAMS – Konzert für Klavier und Orchester (2013). Premiere: 20 March 2014 Leipzig (19. Festival LeipJAZZig, UT Connewitz, LeipJAZZig-Orkester, artentfaltung, Stephan König (direction, piano))
- pulsar variations – Konzert für Klavier und Kammerorchester (2014). Premiere: 7 November 2014 Schönebeck (8. IMPULS-Festival für Neue Musik in Sachsen-Anhalt, Dr.-Tolberg-Saal, Mitteldeutsche Kammerphilharmonie, Stephan König (piano), direction: Gerard Oskamp)
- Perpinoa – Trio für Pipa, Piano und Percussion (2014)
- Haddock (2015). Chorkantate zum Exil des Thomanerchores in der Fürstenschule St. Augustin in Grimma nach den Bombing of Leipzig in World War II, 4 December 1943. Premiere: 17 June 2015 Leipzig (Bachfest Leipzig 2015, Thomaskirche, Leipziger Cantorey, Thomanerchor, Staatskapelle Weimar, direction: Thomaskantor Georg Christoph Biller)
- Wasserpyramiden – Hommage à Paul Klee (2015). Quartett für Englischhorn, Fagott, Viola und Gitarre (op. 206). Premiere 23 April 2015 Leipzig (Museum der bildenden Künste in Leipzig, Ensemble Sortisatio)
- Die Winde des Sommers (Los vientos del verano) (2015)
- SOLARIS – a jazz-symphonic poem (2015)
- An der Arche um Acht (2016)
- Agapanthe – Trio für Violine, Violoncello und Klavier (2016)
- Sieben Arten den Regen zu beschreiben (2017)
- Dreamscapes (2017). Musikalische Traumlandschaften für Jazz-Trio und Orchester. Premiere: 29 January 2018 Leipzig (Gewandhaus, Akademisches Orchester Leipzig, Stephan König (piano), Thomas Stahr (Kontrabass), Dominique Ehlert (Schlagzeug), direction: Horst Förster)

== Recordings ==
- LeipJAZZig-Orkester Vol. 1/2 [Live aus der naTo (cultural institution) (querstand 2005/2007) with the LeipJAZZig-Orkester (Ltg. Stephan König) // Ballade für Jazz-Orchester, Konzert für Klavier und Jazz-Orchester among others.
- K3 – Die drei Klavierkonzerte (auris-subtilis 2008) with Stephan König (Klavier, Ltg.), der Jenaer Philharmonie, Hans Rotmann (Ltg.), dem Kammerorchester artentfaltung und dem LeipJAZZig-Orkester // Konzert für Klavier und Orchester, Konzert für Klavier und Kammerorchester, Konzert für Klavier und Jazz-Orchester
- Hommage an Paul und Paula (aus dem Original-Soundtrack von Peter Gotthardt) [CDs/DVD] (Buschfunk 2010)
- 12 Préludes für Klavier – Jazzinspirierte Klangbilder op. 186 (Friedrich Hofmeister Musikverlag 2010)
- komm herein (Timezone 2010) with the nurso-chanson
- CHANSONetteS mit Bach (Rondeau Production 2012) with Ute Loeck (Chansonette), Georg Christoph Biller (Thomaskantor) und Stephan König (pianio)
- Bach in Jazz (Rondeau Production 2012) with the Stephan König-Trio and Martin Petzold (tenor)
- Stern-Combo Meißen: Bilder Einer Ausstellung [The Rock Version, Live, CD/DVD] (Buschfunk 2015) with the Leipziger Symphonieorchester and the Landesjugendchor Sachsen (Ltg. Stephan König)
- Bachfest Leipzig 2015 – Ausgewählte Höhepunkte (Bachfest Leipzig 2015) mit der Leipziger Cantorey, dem Thomanerchor Leipzig, der Staatskapelle Weimar and Georg Christoph Biller among others // Haddock
