= Alexander Keuk =

German composer and journalist

Alexander Keuk (born 13 October 1971) is a German composer and music journalist.

== Life ==
Born in Wuppertal, Keuk completed an apprenticeship as a retail salesman from 1990 to 1992 after his Abitur. From 1993 to 1999 he studied musical composition with Hans Jürgen Wenzel at the Hochschule für Musik Carl Maria von Weber. He graduated with a thesis on The 7 Sonatas for 2 Violins by Allan Pettersson, followed by a postgraduate education. (among others with Wilfried Krätzschmar) in composition, which he completed in 2001 with a Konzertexamen. Starting during his studies, Keuk has been working as a freelance author for the cultural editorial department of Dresdner Neueste Nachrichten since 1996.

Since 2002 he has been working in Dresden as a freelance composer and music journalist. He regularly writes articles for the Neue Musikzeitung, the Neue Zeitschrift für Musik and the specialist magazine Positionen. From 2001 to 2003 Keuk was the managing director of the Saxon Society for New Music. Since 1992 he has been on the board of the International Allan Pettersson Society and was chairman of the Dresdner Kammerchor until 2018.

In 1999 he was a scholarship holder of the Sächsische Kulturstiftung and the Sächsischer Musikrat in Künstlerhaus Schloss Wiepersdorf. Three times he received a working scholarship from Freistaat Sachsen.

In cooperation with the Deutsche Oper Berlin, the European Centre for the Arts Hellerau and the Theater an der Parkaue a music theatre for children was created in 2003. For several years Keuk also worked with pupils on composition projects at Dresden schools.

On the occasion of Dresden's 800th anniversary, Keuk was commissioned by the city of Dresden and the Dresden Philharmonic to compose the orchestral work Mehr Licht!, which was premiered in May 2006 in a cycle concert of the orchestra.

== Compositions ==
=== Stage music ===
- DR. OX V5.1, Children opera for 7 singers and ensemble after a text by Jules Verne, libretto by Wolfgang Willaschek, 2000–2003, 1 October 2003, Schlosstheater Dresden

=== Orchestra and music ensemble ===
- Gebet for speaker and orchestra after a text by Georg Heym, 1992/93, 16 April 1993, Theater Halberstadt
- Ein deutsches Kettenrondomassaker for chamber orchestra, 1994/95,5 October 1996, Hochschule für Musik Dresden, cond. Christian Münch
- Marche Funèbre de la Pensée – Bruchstücke vom Schauen und Hören for 11 brass instruments and percussion, 1997, premiered 6 May 1998, Hochschule für Musik Dresden
- Ultimatum for large orchestra, 1998, premiere 13 May 2001, Semperoper Dresden
- Kläng for orchestra, 2000/01, premiere 20 April 2001, Lukaskirche Dresden, Elbland Philharmonie Sachsen
- Da fragte ich mich/was für eine Kälte/muss über die Leute gekommen sein for chamber ensemble, 2000, 1 December 2000, Dresden
- Luc and Teo having some drinks at the Flamingo Bar for orchestra, 2005, premiere: 29 October 2005, Friedrichshafen
- Mehr Licht! for large orchestra, 2005/06, 20 May 2006, Dresden Philharmonic, cond. Peter Gülke
- TIME BLAST for clarinet, horn and cello solo and large orchestra, 2012, premiere: 2 November 2012, Landesjugendorchester Sachsen, cond. Milko Kersten
- Doppelkonzert für 2 Violinen und Orchester, 2012/13, 21 March 2013, Freiberg, Duo Gelland (violin), Mittelsächsische Philharmonie, cond. Jan Michael Horstmann

=== Vocal musik ===
- Den Wolken II – marana sati for soprano, mezzo-soprano and harpsichord after a text von Georg Heym, 1994, 27 April 1994, Hochschule für Musik Dresden
- Musik für die Performance "Kompluxus" for choir and instruments, 1995/96, 23 June 1995, Hochschule für Bildende Künste Dresden
- Die Blinden for tenor and piano after a text by Georg Heym, 1993/97, 17 December 1997, Hochschule für Musik Dresden
- (Warum Puschkin) cycle in 6 songs for soprano, baritone and piano after texts by Alexander Puschkin, 1999, 24 November 1999, Humboldt-Universität Berlin
- Monolog des verrückten Mastodons for women's choir after a text by Paul Scheerbart, 2002, UA on the occasion of the German Choir competition 6 May 2002, Schloss Osnabrück
- Psalm-Motette Erforsche mich Gott for eight-part mixed choir after Psalm 139, 2004, 6 March 2005, Evangelische Kirche Wilthen
- morgen.metamorphosen for three vocal parts, text by Sabine Bergk, 2007/08, 31 March 2008 Herz-Jesu-Kirche (München)
- Vineta-Exerzitien for mixed choir, 17 January 2009, Hochschule für Musik Dresden, Dresdner Kammerchor, conduct. Hans-Christoph Rademann
- Ein Tropfen, ein Schluck in der Höhe (text Hans Thill) for alto, tenor, choir and orchestra, 8 December 2013, Dresden, Singakademie Dresden, conduct. Ekkehard Klemm
- Damyata for 3 choirs a cappella, 9 May 2014, Dresden, Taipeh Male Choir, Dresdner Kammerchor, Chor des Vitzthum-Gymnasiums Dresden, cond. Olaf Katzer

=== Chamber music ===
- Soliloquy für Querflöte Solo, 1992, UA 30 Mai 1992, Blankenburg
- Licht-Blicke, Novellen für 3 Querflöten, 1993, 28 January 1995 Zentrum für Zeitgenössische Musik Dresden
- Als wenn die Welt aus Lego wär, Orgelmusik in einem Satz, 1994, 31 August 1994 Dominikanerkirche Münster, Philipp Maintz (organ)
- Distraire für Violine Solo, 1994/96, 11 December 1996, Dresden
- ...Nicht auslöschen...Ströme...nicht ertränken..., Sonata for viola and trombone, 1997, 22 June 1998 Teplice
- Flash for clarinet solo, 1998, premiere 24 November 1999 Hochschule für Musik Dresden, published as Composition in Entweder/Oder Nr. 75, ed. by Uwe Warnke
- Klaviertrio, 1999, 17 May 2002 Leipzig
- Bagatelle for 2 violins, 2003, 28 May 2003, Dreikönigskirche, Dresden, Duo Gelland
- Refrain for Cello, Conveyor belt and record player, 2007, 14 November 2007, Hochschule für Musik Dresden, Matthias Lorenz (cello)
- Die sieben letzten Worte for organ, 2008, 31 March 2008, Herz-Jesu-Kirche München
- DATTA for viola Solo, 2012, 2013, Munich, Nils Mönkemeyer (Bratsche)

=== Electronic Music ===
- Bläue, Vierkanal-Bandstück, 1997, 28 October 1997 Lüneburg
