= Philipp J. Neumann =

German theatre director

Philipp J. Neumann (born 1977 in Leipzig, Saxony) is a German theatre and film director, author and graphic designer.

== Education, theatre and film work ==
According to his own website, Philipp J. Neumann joined the Leipzig Gewandhaus Children's Choir at the age of six and directed his first short films and plays at the age of 15. From 1999 onwards, he staged operas by Christoph Willibald Gluck in particular and oratorios by George Frideric Handel in several countries, as well as other musical pieces. In addition, since 1997 he has worked on various film productions, as a director, producer, cinematographer, film editor and screenwriter.

In 2002, Neumann was among the co-founders of the Richard Wagner Society Leipzig 2013, of which he was a board member until 2013.

== Stage productions ==
- 1999: Orfeo ed Euridice, opera by Christoph Willibald Gluck, in the church ruins at Wachau near Leipzig
- 2000: Iphigénie en Tauride, opera by Gluck, in the church ruins at Wachau near Leipzig
- 2001: Acis and Galatea, oratorio by George Frideric Handel, performed with the Bach Society of Columbia University in Leipzig and New York
- 2003 and 2004: The Magic Word and Poor Heinrich, singspiels by Josef Gabriel Rheinberger and the opera Pimpinone by Telemann, at the Moritzbastei in Leipzig
- 2005: Brundibár children's opera by Hans Krása, 2009 and 2010 guest performances under the patronage of Chancellor Angela Merkel in Germany and Israel
- 2006: Wagner:Vorspiel, musical theatre during the first Richard Wagner Festival in Leipzig
- 2006: Amadeus Piano, musical theatre based on his own libretto (music by Stephan König) and The Man in the Moon by Cesar Bresgen in the cellar theatre of the Leipzig Opera
- 2008: L'enfant et les sortilèges by Maurice Ravel and Carnival of the Animals by Camille Saint-Saëns at the Musikalische Komödie, Leipzig
- 2008: La rondine by Giacomo Puccini in Gera
- 2010 Euro-scene Leipzig: Prophecy 20/11, Instinkttheater, in co-production with the European Centre of the Arts Hellerau
- 2012: Eloise – An opera for young people, in conjunction with the Gewandhaus Children's Choir, Leipzig
- 2013: Der Ring – Ein Musiktheater, in conjunction with the Gewandhaus Children's Choir, Leipzig
- 2015: Wenn der Mond aufgeht, lernst du fliegen, works by Richard Strauss in arrangements by Timo Jouko Herrmann, collaborative project between the Leipzig Gewandhaus Orchestra and the Barbican Centre London
- 2015: The Second Hurricane, scenic project with the Gewandhaus Children's Choir (direction: Frank-Steffen Elster)
- 2017: Von Zwergen, Riesen und Kindern, scenic project with the Gewandhaus Children's Choir (direction: Frank-Steffen Elster)
- 2019: Uprising! scenic project with the Gewandhaus Children's Choir (direction: Frank-Steffen Elster)

== Performance ==
- 2005: Everest Deconstruction – die Zerstörung des weltgrößten Panoramabildes by Yadegar Asisi in the Leipzig Gasometer

== Films ==
- 1998: Der Ton in der Mitte. Feature film. Director, writer, editor, producer and cameraman
- 2000: Das geliebte Moll. Documentary. Director and screenwriter (MDR, 3sat)
- 2002: Die Apostophkiller. Short film. Director, cameraman, editor and screenwriter
- 2004: Ins Fremdland. Documentary. Director and screenwriter
- 2006: Musikschule Leipzig. Imagefilm. Director, producer and screenwriter
- 2008: Berliner Salon. Short film. Director
- 2010: Atropos. Short film. Director

== Awards ==
- 1999: visionale Leipzig, 1st prize for the feature film Der Ton in der Mitte
- 2010: Euro-scene Leipzig, 1st prize in the 20th anniversary project call for the piece Prophezeiung 20/11
- 2011: Kurzsüchtig – Leipzig Short Film Festival, prize of the expert jury in the field of fiction for Atropos
- 2012: Filmfest Dresden, national competition: Golden Rider for the short film Atropos
