= Duo Gelland =

Swedish-German violin duo

Duo Gelland is a Swedish-German violin duo on the international classical scene. The members are Cecilia and Martin Gelland. The duo was founded in 1994.

== Life ==
Their early recordings of Cantus gemellus by Dieter Acker and the fiercely demanding one-hour-long cycle for two violins (1951) by Allan Pettersson showed the true potentials of the violin duo, inspiring many composers to turn to this medium. Characteristic for Duo Gelland's work with new music is the close collaboration with composers and the search for an individual world of sounds for each new composition approached. Duo Gelland received over 300 dedications, among them duos by: Giorgio Netti, Bernd Franke, Samuel Adler, Hans-Joachim Hespos, Daniel Asia, Alexander Keuk, Reiko Füting, Madeleine Isaksson, Birgitte Alsted, Jörgen Dafgård, Kerstin Jeppsson, Ingvar Karkoff, Maurice Karkoff, Olov Franzén, Gunnar Bucht, Carin Bartosch Edström, Rolf Martinsson, Sunleif Rasmussen, Erika Förare, Miklós Maros, Mikael Forsman, Thomas Liljeholm, Maria Lithell, Ylva Bentancor, Marsel Nichan, Sanna Ahvenjärvi, Tapio Lappalainen, Gerhard Samuel, Joey Crane, Sam Krahn, Joshua Musikantow, Tiffany M. Skidmore, Saman Samadi, Britta Byström, Johan Ramström, Paula af Malmborg Ward, Marie Samuelsson, Peter Schuback, Victoria Bond, Anders Hultqvist, Peter Lindroth, Hans Parent, Max Käck, Cecilia Franke, Harri Wessman, Gunnar Valkare, Fredrik Hagstedt, Ole Lützow-Holm, Nikolaus Brass, Farangis Nurulla–Khoja, Francisco Corthey, Michael Fiday, Chi-Yen Huang, Jay Afrisando, James Falzone, Andreas F. Staffel, Ulrika Emanuelsson, Krister Hansén, Aron Hitman, Johan Samskog, Nicaela Coté, Simon Christensen, Leo Correia de Verdier, Ivo Nilsson, Justin Henry Rubin, Gunnar Valkare, Tomas Winter, Joshua Wat.

Duo Gelland also premiered duos by other composers – never performed due to lack of permanent violin duos – by Werner Wolf Glaser, Gunnar Berg, Hans Holewa, Erika Förare, Oleg Gotskosik, Ture Rangström. Further important duos belonging to their repertory are those by Luigi Nono, James Dillon, Olga Neuwirth, Giacinto Scelsi, Roman Haubenstock-Ramati, Jacqueline Fontyn.

Duo Gelland's performance of Traumwerk by James Dillon was filmed by Johan Ramström. It was awarded the Jahrespreis der deutschen Schallplattenkritik 2008. Another award is the Interpreter’s Prize of the Society of Swedish Composers (FST). The inscription reads: They take on the new music with an overwhelming empathy and a virtually feverish intensity, catching the audience in a bubble of absolute presence.

Duo Gelland received dedications of works for violin duo and orchestra or ensemble by Harold Blumenfeld (premiered 1996), Ingvar Karkoff (premiered 2009), Alexander Keuk (premiered 2013), Olov Franzén (premiered 2014), Olof Lindgren (premiered 2002). Håkan Larsson (premiered 2002). January 2003 Duo Gelland premiered Håkan Larsson's Angesicht in Angesicht – inspired by Ingmar Bergman's films – for violin duo and orchestra in the Berliner Philharmonie with a festival orchestra. Spring 2003 two works for violin duo and choir by Hans-Erik Dahlgren and Olof Lindgren were premiered together with Dresdner Kammerchor and Hans-Christoph Rademann. With the same choir and conductor they gave the first performance of Zu Unserer Zeit Sprechen by Samuel Adler in Dresden Frauenkirche in remembrance of the November pogrome 80 years. In Berliner Philharmonie 2006 together with the RIAS Kammerchor and Hans-Christoph Rademann, Duo Gelland premiered works for violin duo and choir by Sunleif Rasmussen, Peter Schuback and Håkan Larsson. In 2023 Duo Gelland premiered two new double concertos by Cecilia Franke and Jörgen Dafgård. In 2024 they gave the first performance of Giga by Reiko Füting with Mitteldeutsche Kammerphilharmonie under Jan Michael Horstmann.

Duo Gelland's style of interpretation was described in the German encyclopedia MGG: "Statt einer speziellen ästhetischen Ausrichtung geht es dem Duo Gelland um die Realisierung des jeweiligen speziellen Klangvorrats und der individuellen Klanglichkeit der einzelnen Komposition." The dramatic and physical qualities of Duo Gelland's stage presence has been cultivated in cross over productions e.g. in provocatively moving The donkey on Mars, text Kasëm Trebeshina (Albania), in collaboration with choreographer Britta Hanssen and composer Birgitte Alsted. Here the synthesis of emotion, motion, word and sound is explored in a mode which could be referred to as violin theater. The encyclopedia Die Violine comments their achievements: "It shows how a chamber music genre that is perceived as marginal can be developed into a new, fruitful blossoming under the prerequisite of serious artistic engagement."

Duo Gelland's growing historic repertory involves research in archives and libraries. The musicologist Ulrich Mazurowicz points out that the second half of the 18th century into the beginning of the 19th century was a period when string duos were printed more often than any other constellation including songs, operas, string quartets, music for orchestra or piano. Of all these string duos the major part was violin duos. Duo Gelland's work with historic music can be exemplified by their recording of Antonio Vivaldi's Sonatas for two violins. Ken Meltzer: "The artists pursue an HIP approach, with a lean, transparent sonority that avoids vibrato, fleet tempos in the outer movements, and ornamentation. The Duo Gelland performs these works in brilliant fashion, with razor-sharp articulation and a profound, constant sense of interaction." Duo Gelland's continuous study of historic literature on music performance, theory and philosophy is a source of inspiration facing both their old and their new repertoire.

As artists in residence 2002 – 2011 in the municipality of Strömsund, Jämtland, northern Sweden, Duo Gelland developed their interactive and mutually artistically stimulating work with children and teens referred to as The Strömsund method. They continually visit a great number of classrooms meeting children and young people from toddlers to college students, with an emphasis on pupils in mandatory school. Their work has been observed for the purpose of research in the US, Germany and Sweden. Constanze Rora explains: "They primarily play contemporary works from their repertoire and talk to the children and young people about the music. Through further interactive elements such as collaborative improvisation, instant composing, and painting to music, they succeed in opening them up to a dialogue with and about music." Cecilia Gelland says: "An unimaginably high degree of mastery of complex thinking, feeling, and creating is demanded of us in our society, even just in order to uphold democracy... Music offers a forum for highly complex experiences." Martin Gelland writes: "I would describe the fantasy world as a parallel world, a world we create ourselves, one we can influence and shape." Erkki Huovinen concludes: "It is shown how the Gellands create musical contexts in which children’s vulnerabilities can be safely exposed and transformed. At the same time, the musicians see children’s engagement as proving the social value of the music. In providing a neutralising arena for children’s sometimes frightening and violent realities, the Gellands demonstrate a model for 'health musicianship', challenging sharp distinctions between artistic, pedagogical and therapeutic realms."

Cecilia Gelland studied violin and chamber music with Harald Thedéen, Sven Karpe, Josef Grünfarb, Pierre d'Archambeau, Machie Oguri-Kudo, Walter Levin and each one of the other members of the LaSalle Quartet, Kurt Sassmannshaus, Ingeborg Scheerer and with Allen Sapp also music theory and composition. Martin Gelland studied violin and chamber music with Max Rostal, Ricardo Odnoposoff, Gerhart Hetzel, and for shorter periods Valery Klimov, Wolfgang Schneiderhan and Franco Gulli. From the age of eleven he studied the piano with Anna Stadler.

== Discography ==
- Allan Pettersson, Seven Sonatas for Two Violins (1951), 58 min.
- Werner Wolf Glaser, Duo (1966), 17 min.
- Dieter Acker, Cantus gemellus (1973) 9 min.
- Erika Förare, Duo op. 1 (1976–79), 27 min. and Duo no. 2 (2002), 12 min.
- James Dillon, Traumwerk (1995–96), 26 min.
- Olof Lindgren, Jieleden Vuilie (Chant of Life) (1995) and other works (1995–2002), 67 min.
- Olov Franzén, Autumn Duo (1997), 16 min.
- Anders Hultqvist, Apricot trees exist (1998/2000), 9 min.
- Birgitte Alsted, Zweigeigen (2001), 13 min.
- Gunnar Bucht, Partita (2001), 15 min. and Tre per due (2004), 16 min.
- Peter Schuback, del altro al altro (2001), 14 min.
- Max Käck, Aonia terra (2001), 12 min.
- Håkan Larsson, När intet blir allt (2002), 14 min.
- Kerstin Jeppsson, Canto cromàtico (2002) 18 min.
- Hans-Erik Dahlgren, Imagines Memoriae (2002) and other works (2002–2004), 32 min.
- Rolf Martinsson, Symbiosis (2003), 19 min.
- Ingvar Karkoff, Largo (2004) 7 min. and Gelland Suite (2004), 8 min.
- Bernd Franke, "in between (IV)" (2007), 11 min.
- Oleg Gotskosik, From the Jewish Folk tradition (1990), 23 min.
- Cecilia Franke, Febris (2005), 11 min.
- Johan Ramström, KAKEL (2002), 13 min.
- Johan Ramström, Vallombrosa (2008), 7 min.
- Hans-Erik Dahlgren, Imagines memoriae (2002), 12 min.
- Sanna Ahvenjärvi, Fingers to the Bone (2004), 12 min.
- Tapio Lappalainen, Violin Duo (2004), 7 min.
- Alexander Keuk, Bagatelle (2003), 11 min.
- Aron Hidman, Chaconne (2001), 12 min.
- Johan Samskog, Al cielo (2001), 13 min.
- Jonas Asplund, Forms of the floating fragments (2007), 11 min.
- Justin Henry Rubin, Three Chorales (2009), 7 min.
- Justin Henry Rubin, Samuel Greenberg Constellation (2009), 10 min.
- Fredrik Hagstedt, Depurazione (2002), 29 min.
- Fredrik Hagstedt, Sinfonia per due violini (2011), 46 min.
- Giorgio Netti, inoltre (2006), 18 min.
- Ole Lützow-Holm, Terra 8-band version, 15 min.
- Peter Lindroth, Para dos violines (2014–15), 21 min.
- Justin Henry Rubin, There were three Ravens (2011), 8 min.
- Justin Henry Rubin, Canon (2011), 2 min.
- Maria Lithell Flyg, Duolog (2015), 6 min.
- Jacqueline Fontyn, Analecta (1981), 9 min.
- Carin Bartosch Edström, Asthmose (2006), 15 min.
- Samuel Adler, Five Related Miniatures (2014), 11 min.
- Britta Byström, Volley (2016), 11 min.
- Marie Samuelsson, Two lives (2013), 10 min.
- Luigi Nono, Hat que caminar sognando (1989), 17 min.
- Bruno Maderna, Serenata per un satellite (1969), 15 min.
- Jeremy Wagner, Oberleitung (2013), 7 min.
- Michael Duffy, A Lifeless Object, Alive (Dysarthria) (2013), 4 min.
- Joshua Musikantow, Autochrome Lumière (2016), 9 min.
- Sam Krahn, Resistance/resonance (2013), 7 min.
- Adam Zahller, Difficult Ferns (2014), 16 min.
- Tiffany M. Skidmore, cistern . anechoic . sonolucent (2016), 10 min.
- Wilhelm Peterson-Berger, Duett, Polska, Gånglåt (1889)
- Hans Holewa, Drei Stücke op. 3 (1931)
- Ture Rangström, Tre dansminiatyrer (1934)
- Werner Wolf Glaser, Fyra fragment (1948)
- Lille Bror Söderlundh, Miniatyrer (ca 1950)
- Edvin Kallstenius, Svit av tre evighets-kanons (1958)
- Bo Linde, Två duetter (1963)
- Maurice Karkoff, Visa vid källan (1975)
- Ingvar Karkoff, Con intensità (1978)
- Inger Wikström, Tre Violinduetter (1988)
- Håkan Larsson, Episoder (1995)
- Hans-Erik Dahlgren, Berceuse (2002)
- Cecilia Franke, Iuxta (2001)
- Krister Hansén, Semplice (2001)
- Erika Förare, Bortanför – Hitanom (2003)
- Johan Samskog, See Change Above (2004)
- Antonio Vivaldi, Quattro sonate per due violini RV 68, 70, 71, 77, 46 min.

== Awards ==
- Jämtlands Landstingets Kulturpris 2011
- Nutida Sound 2011
- Jahrespreis der deutschen Schallplattenkritik 2008
- Rosenborg-Gehrmans Ensemble Prize 2005
- The Society of Swedish Composers’ Interpreter’s Prize (FST) 2003
- Västerbotten County Council Great Award 2002
- Västerbottens-Kurirens Kulturpris 2000

== Bibliography ==
=== Duo Gelland ===
- Constanze Rora, Qualitäten musikalischer Teilhabe: Violinduo Cecilia & Martin Gelland über ein besonderes Konzertformat für Kinder und Jugendliche in: neue musikzeitung (nmz), Regensburg, June 2020
- »… eine ganz eigene Art von Schönheit« Cecilia und Martin Gelland im Gespräch mit Stefan Drees über die Komposition a e r i (2012) von Hans-Joachim Hespos, in: Seiltanz Heft 14, April 2017
- Das große Lexikon der Violine, Laaber 2015: Duo Gelland.
- Stefan Drees, Experimentierfreude und Repertoireerkundung. Zur Arbeit des Duo Gelland, in: Die Tonkunst 4, 2008, 466f
- Stefan Drees, Until the singing of the spheres brings us together, in: Die Tonkunst 3, 2008, 419f
- Stefan Drees, Engagement im Dienste einer vernachlässigten Gattung, in: Dissonanz 93, März 2006, 43f
- Anna Rudroff, Ästhetische Erfahrung als Ziel von Musikunterricht – Fragen an ein musikpädagogisches Praxiskonzept aus Schweden, Leipzig 2008
- Die Musik in Geschichte und Gegenwart (MGG), Kassel 1994–2008: Duo Gelland
- Gunilla Petersén, Hyllad violinduo har fötterna i jämtlänsk jord, Kammarmusik-Nytt, 2009.
- Jonas Asplund, ...det rör om i hjärnan på något sätt: En beskrivning av en interpretationsprocess inom samtida konstmusik ur ett kommunikationsperspektiv, Örebro Universitet, Örebro 2007
- Ylva Nyberg, Duo Gelland, in: Nutida Musik 47, 2004, H. 1, 38f
- Gustaf Jilker, Kulturambassadörer, in: Samefolket 2002, H. 9, 46
- Henrik Martén, Duo Gelland – en färgstark ensemble, in: Kammarmusik-Nytt 19, 2002, H. 2, 9
- Stefani Ragni, I violini del grande nord, in: Studi e documentazioni 20, 2001, Nr. 41, 37f
- Cecilia Gelland, Tystnaden är utrotningshotad, in: Coniunctio 2008
- Martin Gelland, Bühne der Grazien – Das Anmutige in der Ornamentik des Rokokostils, in: Zeitschrift Ästhetische Bildung, Jg. 11 Nr. 1 (2019)
- Martin Gelland, Gehörtes re-formulieren – Sprechen über Musik als musikpädagogisches Konzept, Zeitschrift Ästhetische Bildung, Jg. 10 Nr. 1 (2018)
- Martin Gelland, ... um etwas davon plötzlich aufleuchten zu lassen, Darstellungsprobleme individuellen Erlebens, Zeitschrift Ästhetische Bildung, Jg. 6 Nr. 2 (2014)
- Martin Gelland, Erzwungene Kunst: Schmerz und Freiheitserlebnis, Allan Pettersson und Jean-Paul Sartre im Wechselspiel, in: Musik-Konzepte Heft 162, July 2013
- Martin Gelland, Sprunghaftes im gelähmten Stillstand, Allan Pettersson (1911–1980) zum 100. Geburtstag, in: Die Tonkunst 4, 2011

=== Violin duo and history ===
- Ulrich Mazurowicz, Das Streichduett in Wien von 1760 bis zum Tode Joseph Haydns, Eichstätter Abhandlungen zur Musikwissenschaft, Band 1, Hans Schneider, Tutzing 1982
- Walter Kolneder, Das Buch der Violine, Antlantis, 1972 and 1993
- Wilhelm Joseph von Wasielewski, Die Violine und ihre Meister, 1868, 4th edition Dresden 1927
