= Magnus Andersson (guitarist) =

Contemporary Swedish classical guitarist

Per Otto Magnus Andersson (born 29 June 1956) is a contemporary Swedish classical guitarist.

== Biography ==
Andersson has long been active in the contemporary music field, and has played a significant role in the creation of the modern guitar repertoire. He studied at the Trinity College of Music, London, and at the Viotti Music Academy in Vercelli, Italy. In 1984 Magnus Andersson founded the guitar class at the International Summer Courses for New Music in Darmstadt (Internationale Ferienkurse für Neue Musik), where he taught until 1996. He teaches at the Royal College of Music in Stockholm, and is a founding member of the innovative chamber music group Ensemble SON and was artistic director of the 2006 and 2008 Stockholm New Music Festival.

Magnus Andersson received the Swedish Gramophone Prize in 1985 and 1986 and was nominated for a Swedish Grammy in 1992. He was awarded the Composers Union Interpreter Prize in 1983 and the Kranischsteiner Prize in Darmstadt in 1984.

He has performed the premieres of numerous important contemporary works including works by Ferneyhough, Sandström, Dillon, etc.

== Pieces written for Magnus Andersson include ==
=== Solo and chamber music ===
- Claudio Ambrosini Rap
- Mark Applebaum DNA for solo guitar
- Xavier Benguerel Versus; "Cantus"
- Daniel Börtz Etchings for solo guitar
- Aldo Clementi Serenata
- James Dillon Shrouded Mirrors (1987)
- Franco Donatoni Ase (Algo II)
- Mikael Edlund Små Fötter
- Brian Ferneyhough Kurze Schatten II for solo guitar (1989) (essay, analysis, analysis, score sample)
- Christopher Fox Chile for 11' solo guitar (or solo guitar with organ - organ accompaniment added in 2003)
- Luca Francesconi A Fuoco
- Hans Holewa Duettino II for flute and guitar; Duettino for violin and guitar (1983)
- Kerstin Jeppsson Vocazione
- Josh Levine Downstream for guitar and computer-processed guitar sounds (1992)
- Maurizio Pisati Samblana
- Stellan Sagvik
- Sven-David Sandström Away From
- Asbjørn Schaathun Eclogue (2002)
- Stefano Scodanibbio Dos Abismos
- Alexander Shchetynsky Five Miniatures
- Alex Sigman
- Bent Sørensen Shadow Siciliano for solo guitar
- Erik Ulman
- Fabio Vacchi Notturno Concertante

=== Concertos ===
- Xavier Bengeruel Tempo for guitar and strings
- Franco Donatoni Algo III for guitar and chamber orchestra; Algo IV for guitar and ensemble
- Hans Holewa Concertino VIII (1985); Concertino IX (1987)
- Maurizio Pisati Senti! for guitar and strings
- Sven-David Sandström Lonesome for guitar and orchestra

== Recordings ==
- Chitarra Con Forza (PSCD 19, Phono Suecia) - Magnus Andersson plays Swedish guitar music
- Short Sounds (nosag CD 056, Nosag) - Italian music for guitar
- Brian Ferneyhough: Fourth String Quartet, Kurze Schatten II, Trittico per G.S., Terrain 1 (naïve previously Disques Montaigne)
- The Plucked North (nosag CD 117, Nosag) - New music from Sweden, Denmark and Finland
- Ensemble SON: To Hear with the Mouth (CAP 21713, Caprice Records)
- Stefano Scodanibbio (STR 33668, Stradivarius)
- Hans Werner Henze: El Cimarrón (STR 33733, Stradivarius)
- Xavier Benguerel (Ópera tres) - Music for guitar
- Sven-David Sandström (CAP 21418, Caprice Records) - Lonesome/guitar concerto. Segerstam/RSO
- Hans Holewa (PSCD 49, Phono Suecia) - includes chamber music for guitar by Hans Holewa, Phono Suecia, 1991, OCLC: 24815067

== Writings ==
Magnus Andersson: “Brian Ferneyhough: Kurze Schatten II - considérations d’un interprète”. Contrechamps 8 (1988): p. 128-138.

== Bibliography ==
- Brian Ferneyhough: Brian Ferneyhough by Brian Ferneyhough Publisher: Paris: L'Age d'homme OCLC: 21274317 (French)
- Erik Wallrup: Etyder : om musik Publisher: [Stockholm?] : Bonnier Essä, ©2002 ISBN 91-0-057948-3 OCLC: 52964407 (Swedish)
