= Thomas Stahr =

German bassist and composer

Thomas Stahr is a German bassist and composer, "who demonstrates expertise in both classical and jazz".

== Life and career ==
Stahr first started playing electric bass at the age of 14 and shortly afterwards double bass. He studied classical double bass at the Musikhochschule Köln, among others with Wolfgang Güttler. He passed his final examination in 1986 "with distinction", followed by his concert examination in 1989.

Between 1987 and 1991, he was a lecturer for electric bass and jazz double bass at the Rheinische Musikschule in Cologne. Since 1991, he has been a member of the Gewandhaus Orchestra.

Stahr played in several big bands, the German Philharmonic Big Band, Köln Big Band, Leipzig Big Band and the LeipJAZZig-Orkester under the direction of Stephan König. Since 1998, he has worked in the New Leipzig Jazztrio with Wolfram Dix and singer Sabine Helmbold, with whom he released a CD in 2000 and also performed in Tunisia in 2002. He performed with Nigel Kennedy, Ron Williams, Thomas Freitag and Jiggs Whigham, among others..

Stahr plays in the König-Trio with Stephan König on piano and Wieland Götze on drums; in this trio he presented the album Bach in Jazz (Rondeau, 2012) with Martin Petzold. He can also be heard on albums with Claude Chalhoub.

Furthermore, he is a lecturer for electric bass and jazz double bass at the University of Music and Theatre Leipzig.
