= Wieland Götze =

German singer-songwriter and drummer

Wieland Götze is a German jazz drummer and singer-songwriter.

== Biography ==
Götze has been taking lessons at the music school since 1991. He did his military service from 1998 in the Bundeswehr training music corps in Hilden; from 2000 to 2002, he played as a regular soldier in the Heeresmusikkorps 2 in Kassel. Between 2002 and 2006, he studied at the Hochschule für Musik Franz Liszt, Weimar.

Since 1994, he has been active in various rock and jazz bands. He took lessons with Jo Thönes, Sperie Karas and Werner Schmitt, among others.

Götze played in various musical productions such as Mephisto (Weimar 2003), Chess (Nordhausen 2007), West Side Story (Meiningen 2009 & Göttingen 2011/12), Fame (Gera & Altenburg) and On the Town (Nordhausen). Since 2003, he was the drummer of the Leipzig BigBand; with this formation he played various concerts with (among others) Nina Hagen and at the 38th Montreux Jazz Festival. From 2005 Götze played at Classic meets Rock with the Thüringen Philharmonie Gotha-Eisenach and the Band-Vital from Erfurt.

Götze works in the "LeipJAZZig Orkester" under the direction of Stephan König. He is a drummer in the König Trio with Stephan König on piano and Thomas Stahr on bass; in this trio he presented the album Bach in Jazz (Rondeau, 2012) with Martin Petzold. Furthermore, he acts in the gala band "Chris Genteman Group".

In 2017, Götze (as singer, guitarist and pianist) presented his album Travelling Songs, released on Traumton Records with his own compositions, which was created in the duo Colourwood in collaboration with guitarist Christian Hildebrandt.
