= Sunleif Rasmussen =

Faroese composer of classical music

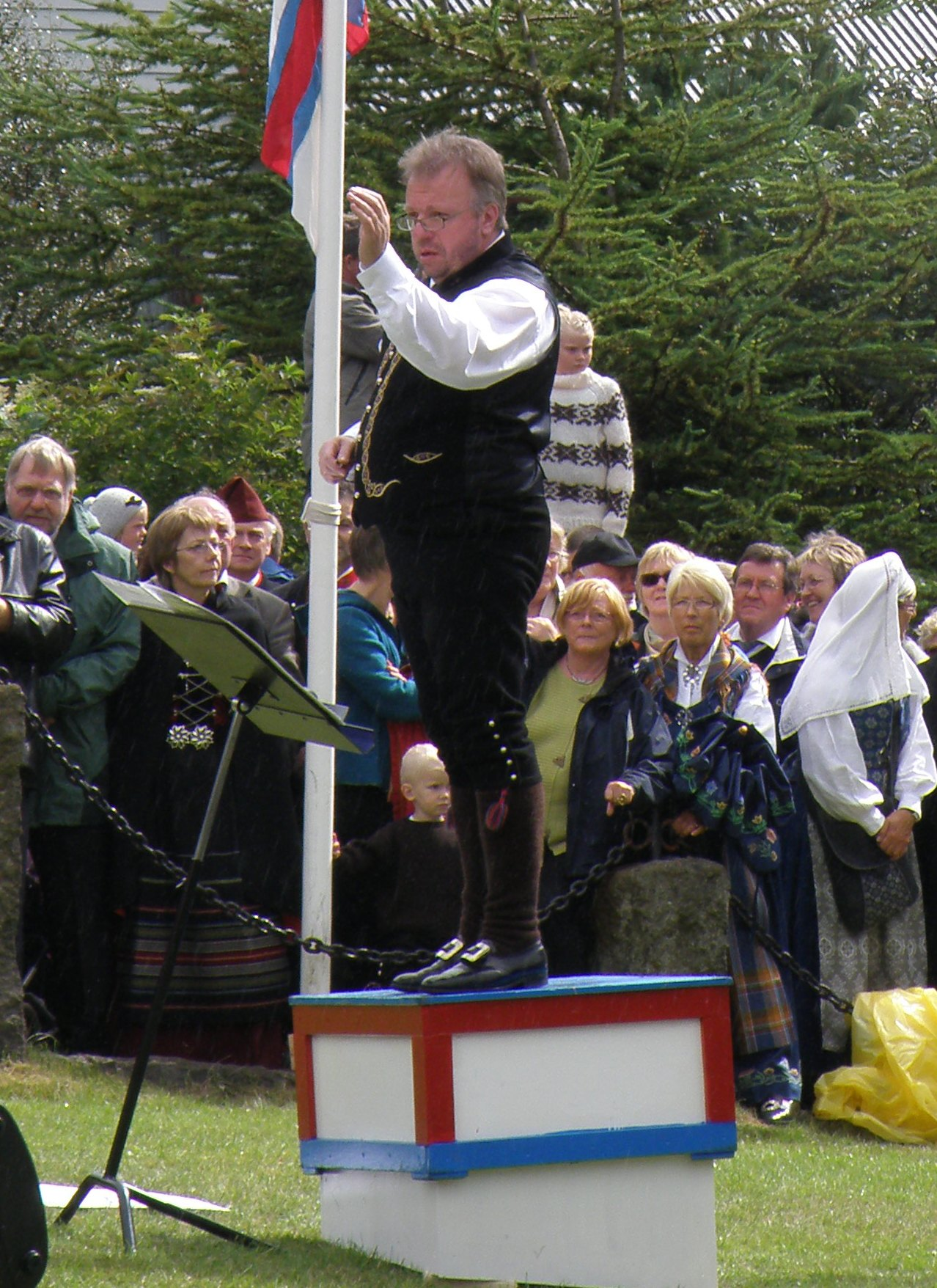
Sunleif Rasmussen conducting the Olavsoka Cantata 2009, which he composed. The photo was taken on Tinghúsvøllur in Tórshavn.

Sunleif Rasmussen (born March 19, 1961) is one of the foremost Faroese composers of classical music.

== Biography ==
Rasmussen was born in Sandur in the Faroe Islands. He studied in Norway, then returned to Tórshavn in the Faroes as a music teacher and jazz pianist. From 1990 to 1995 he studied musical composition at the Royal Danish Academy of Music in Copenhagen under Ib Nørholm and electronic music under Ivar Frounberg. In 1992 he received grants from the Leonie Sonning Foundation and the Danish Composer's Society.

He also became familiar with spectral music, which has its roots at the IRCAM in Paris, and the work of composers such as Tristan Murail. Rasmussen has produced a number of works combining electronic and acoustic instruments, some produced in co-operation with DIEM (the Danish Institute for Electro-Acoustic Music).

In 1997, he was awarded a three-year grant from the Danish State Arts Foundation.

In 2002, he won the Nordic Council Music Prize for his Symphony no. 1 - "Oceanic Days", which, in the NOMUS committee description: "derives its inspiration from Faroese nature and from age-old Faroese hymns, from which Rasmussen has created a work of comprehensive dimensions. It radiates a natural artistic integrity, combining tightness and structure with lyric feeling."

In 2004, he was visiting composer at the prestigious Korsholm Festival in Finland, while in 2010, he received the Faroese Cultural Prize from the Faroese Department of Culture. In 2013, he participated in the residency and concert series Other Minds in San Francisco.

== Music ==
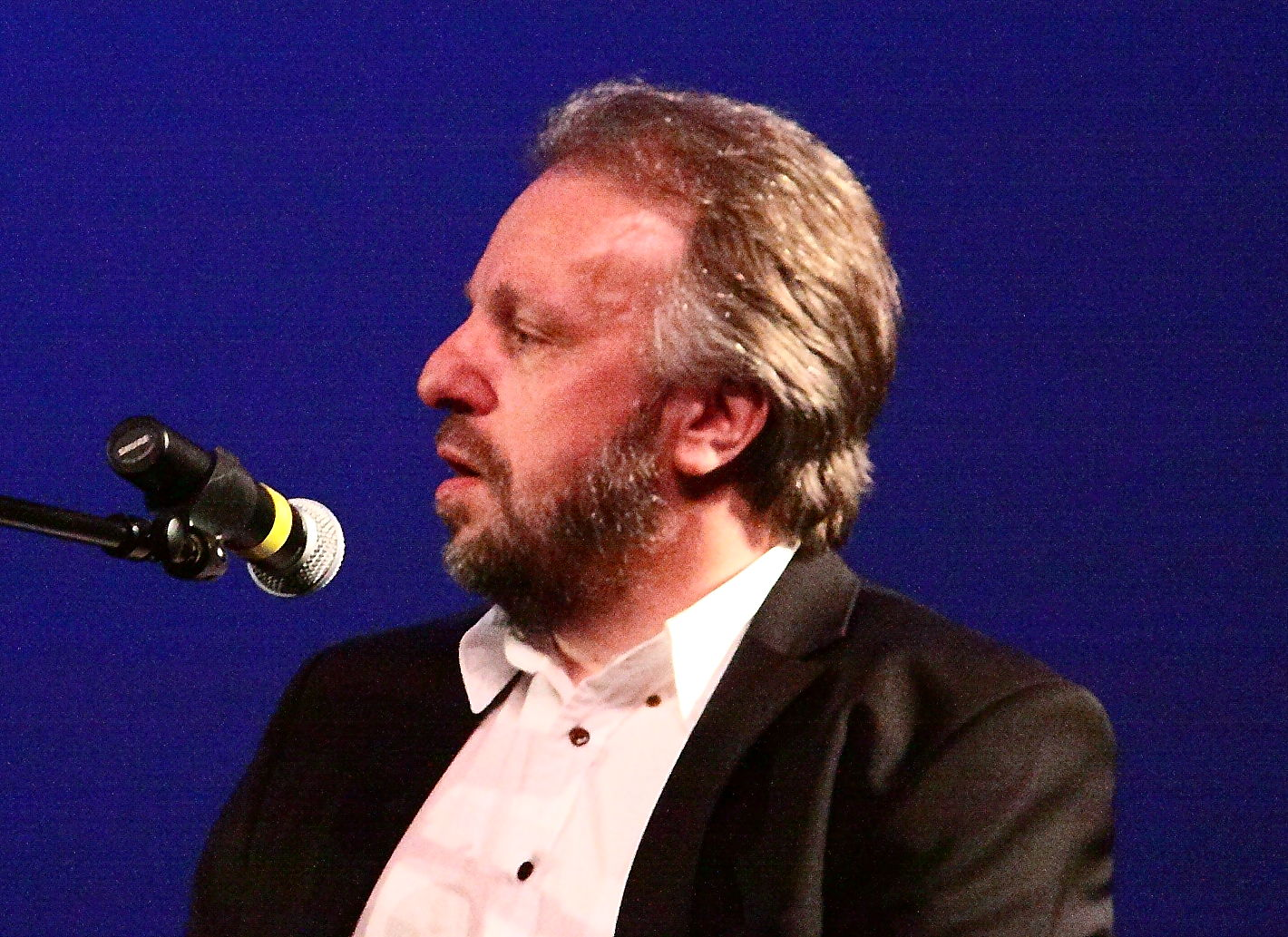
Rasmussen speaking at a pre-concert panel discussion at Other Minds 18 in 2013

Rasmussen’s music always has a natural complexity, combining his jazz background with a rich tradition of Faroese folk music and electroacoustic and spectral music. He transforms folk music themes using spectral and serial techniques, using intervals in the original melody to generate rhythmic segments and harmonic overtone spectra to determine the melodic and timbral material; the result is an abstraction from Faroese traditional music, even though none of the original melodies can be discerned in the finished composition. He also draws much inspiration from the Faroese author and artist William Heinesen (1900-1991), using both the text and the mood of Heinesen's poetry in his music.

Rasmussen aims to compose music that is highly evocative, beautiful, and not difficult to listen to. The power and complexity of his music often reflects nature, shimmering with energy and movement.

== Works ==
His works include:

Orchestral works:

- 1990: Grave - In memoriam Karsten Hoydal for string orchestra + percussion (11 or 22 strings: 3.3.2.2.1) (09'00)
- 1995: Vox Humana, the song of the sea - for orchestra and tape for 3.3.3.3/4.3.3.1/timpani/2 percussion/harp/strings (22'00)
- 1995-97: Symphony no. 1 - "Oceanic Days" for 4.4.4.4/4.4.4.1/4 percussion/2 synth/strings (min. 12.12.10.8.6) (40'00)
- 2003: De grædendes nat for children's choir (including 3 soloists) + 3.3.3.3/4.3.3.1/2 percussion/harp/strings (15'00)
- 2004: Movings and Melodies for 2.2.2.2/2.2.1.0/timpani/percussion/5.5.3.3.2 (17'00)
- 2008: Prelude to an Orchestra for 3(piccolo).3(cor anglais).3.3(contrabassoon)/4.3.3.1/timpani/2 percussion/strings (30'00)
- 2013: Veitsla for 2.2.2.2/4.3.3.1/timpani/3 percussion/strings (12'00)
- 2015: Symphony no. 2 - "The Earth Anew" for soprano, baritone, choir, 3.3.2+bass clarinet, 2+contrabassoon/4331/timpani, 3 percussions/piano/strings (1 hour)

Solo instrument and orchestra/ensemble

- 1992-93: Landid for soprano solo + 3.3.3.3/4.3.3.1/timpani/2 percussion/harp/piano/strings (15'00)
- 1996: Tilegnelse for mezzo-soprano solo + 1.0.1.1/0.1.0.0/2 percussion/harp/guitar/0.0.1.0.1 (10'00)
- 2000: Rejsen for soprano, tenor, bass soli, mixed choir + 3.3.3.3/2.3.3.1/timpani/percussion/piano/strings (30'00)
- 2001: Dem Licht entgegen for saxophone solo + 3.3.3.3/4.3.2.1/timp/2 percussion/piano/strings (18'30)
- 2004: Songs of Seasons for violin solo + string orchestra (10.0.4.3.2) (22'00)
- 2009: Territorial Songs for recorder solo + 3.2.2.2./2.2.2.0/2 percussion/harp/strings 23'00
- 2014: Winter Echoes for recorder solo and 7 violins, 3 violas, 2 cellos and double bass (11'00)

Large chamber ensemble

- 1999: Trauer und Freude for 1.0.1.1/1.0.0.0/piano (+cemb)/guitar/1.1.1.1.0 (21'00)
- 2000: Surrounded for 1.1.1.1/1.1.1.0/percussion/piano/1.1.1.1.1 (13'00)
- 2009: Fanfare lontane for flute, oboe, clarinet, bassoon, horn, 2 trumpets and trombone (15'00)

Chamber works

- 1989: Fantasi yvir Tívilsdøtur for clarinet and horn (04'00)
- 1989-90: Strygekvartet nr. 1 for string quartet (10'00)
- 1990: Vetrarmyndir for flute, oboe, clarinet, bassoon, horn, and piano (09'00)
- 1991: Tid, ild, baglæns (Time, fire, backwards) for twelve singers and tape (16'30)
- 1995: Cantus Borealis for wind quintet (13'00)
- 1995: Dancing Raindrops for clarinet, piano, and violin (12'00)
- 1998: Pictures from the sea’s garden for saxophone and percussion (15'00)
- 1999: Mozaik/Miniature for flute, clarinet, piano, and violin (07'00)
- 2000: Sunshine and Shadows for string quartet (13'00)
- 2002: Nordisk Fanfare for 2 horns, 2 trumpets, trombone, and tuba (04'00)
- 2002: Engführung for chamber choir, piano and cello (20'00)
- 2003: Four Gardens for flute, oboe, clarinet, bassoon, piano, violin, viola, and cello (15'00)
- 2008: Partita for clarinet, piano, violin, and cello (12'00)
- 2010: Three Dances for 4 saxophones (10'00)
- 2011: Andalag No. 1 for flute and clarinet (4'00)
- 2011: Andalag No. 2 for 2 flutes (4'00)
- 2011: Andalag No. 3 for clarinet and horn (4'00)
- 2011: Andalag No. 11 for alto flute and bassoon (4'00)
- 2011: Motion/Emotion for flute, clarinet, oboe, horn, and bassoon (15'00)
- 2012: Flow for recorder, violin, viola, and cello (20'00)
- 2012: Krevgals go Aprah harp and percussion (14'00)
- 2012: Andalag No. 4 for 2 bassoons (4'00)
- 2012: Andalag No. 5 for alto flute, clarinet, bassoon, and horn (8'00)
- 2013: Andalag No. 7 for piccolo, E-flat clarinet, horn, and bassoon (8'00)
- 2013: Autumn for guitar, piano, accordion, violin, and double-bass (9'00)

Solo instrument

- 1992: Echoes of the Past for violin solo (12'00)
- 1993: A light is lit for organ solo and tape (10'00)
- 1993: Like the golden sun for piano solo and effect processor (12'00)
- 1997: Chaindance with Shadows for amplified piano solo (12'00)
- 2001: Le psaume salé for saxophone solo + tape + live-electronics (10'00)
- 2007: Suite for guitar solo and effect processor (15'00)
- 2011: Vogelstimmung for solo recorder (17'00)

Vocal works

- 1982-89, revised 1992: 5 færøske korsange (5 Faroese choir songs) for chamber choir or large mixed choir (11'30)
- 1983, revised 1993: Vár for Soprano, baritone soli + chamber choir, (SATB), fl, cl (09'20)
- 1995: Psalmus 8 for soloists, choir and organ (08'00)
- 1996: Creatio caeli et terrae. Dies unus for triple choir (SATB+SATB+SATB) (09'00)
- 1999: Arktis for mezzo-soprano solo + clarinet, percussion, harp, and cello (08'00)
- 1996: Creatio caeli et terrae for 2 violins and choir (SATB) (12'00), commissioned by RIAS Kammerchor and Duo Gelland
- 2009: Gylfaginning for chamber choir SATB with amplification (30'00)
- 2011: I for alto and tenor soloists, chorus (SATB) and recorder (10'00)
- 2011: Jordpigernes Drøm for 3 soprano, 3 mezzo-soprano, 3 alto (percussion), and SA chorus (percussion) (15'00)
- 2014: Nordisk Messe for SSATBB chorus + 3 (alto flute, piccolo) .3 (cor anglais) .3 (bass clarinet) .2/4.3.3.1/timpani/2 percussion/strings (35'00)

== Recordings ==
Recordings of Rasmussen's music include:

- Rasmussen - Symphony No 1; Saxophone Concerto, Danish National Symphony Orchestra, Hannu Lintu (Conductor), Jeanette Balland (saxophone) - Da Capo, May 2005
- Sunleif Rasmussen - Surrounded: Arktis (The Arctic), Mozaik / Miniature, Tilegnelse (Dedication), Trauer und Freude, Helene Gjerris (mezzo-soprano), Caput Ensemble, Guthmundur Oli Gunnarsson, Guthni Franzson - BIS Records
- Cantus borealis: Wind Music from Faroe Islands includes Rasmussen: Cantus Borealis for wind quintet, Reykjavík Wind Quintet - BIS Records
- Landid for Soprano And Symphony Orchestra, Gerandisdagur I Havn For Soprano And String Orchestra, Grave In Memoriam Karsten Hoydal For String Orchestra, Clarinet And Percussion, Klarinettkonsert Concerto For Clarinet And Orchestra - The Orchard, May 2000
- Skærur Vindur includes Sig mær, hví er foldin føgur, Kvøldvísa um summarmála, Syngjandi grót, Sóljurnar og náttin, Blátt, Fyrsti sálmur Dávids, Vár, Skærur vindur and Tid, Ild, Baglæns - The Orchard, April 2000
