= Jazzahead =

German trade fair & festival

jazzahead! is an annual trade fair and festival for jazz, held in the German city of Bremen.

Since its premiere in 2006, the event has grown to include a culture festival in and around Bremen, in addition to the four-day trade fair. The international music trade fair with its integrated showcase festival focusses in jazz, while the festival in Bremen is for a broad audience.

jazzahead! is organized by a team of Messe Bremen, a division of M3B GmbH Bremen. The artistic direction team is formed by Ulrich Beckerhoff, former professor for jazz trumpet and renowned jazz trumpeter and Peter Schulze, director of Sendesaal Bremen and former director of Jazzfest Berlin. The 2020 jazzahead! trade fair is scheduled for between 23 and 26 April. The trade fair is held in Hall 6 of MESSE Bremen (Bremen Exhibition Center). The jazzahead! festival will start around ten days before.

== Trade fair ==
As a meeting point for the international jazz scene jazzahead! includes an exhibition, showcase festival, panels and conferences. Exhibitors and participants include protagonists from a wide range of the jazz business, such as bookers, club promoters, venues, talent agencies, festival directors, musicians and artists, media representatives and many more.

For the 2019 edition, over 3,400 professionals, including 1,408 exhibiting companies, were registered.

== The Showcase Festival ==
The showcase festival is part of the trade fair and also open to the public. The showcase festival has included the following modules: European Jazz Meeting – with jazz music from around Europe, a German Jazz Expo, Overseas Night – focusing on bands from outside Europe; and a showcase module which presents jazz from the jazzahead! partner country. The partner country of jazzahead! 2020 is Canada.

Showcase concerts at jazzahead! are presented on three different stages, in the afternoons of the trade fair and at night.

== jazzahead! Festival ==
Aside from the trade fair and showcase festival, a growing program for the general public in and around Bremen has developed. Since 2011, this program includes the jazzahead! Clubnight (2011-2014 jazzahead!-ŠKODA clubnight): With only one ticket visitors are able to visit all participating clubs and venues (2019: 34 venues).

Furthermore, a focus is set on the partner country program, presenting the cultural scene of the annually changing jazzahead! partner country in Bremen's cultural institutions. With a wide range of art field, such as theatre, art, performances, cinema as well as literature and readings, the festival gives not only an insight into the jazz scene of the partner country but also into the culture.

Partner countries since 2011 have been:

- 2011: Turkey
- 2012: Spain
- 2013: Israel
- 2014: Denmark
- 2015: France
- 2016: Switzerland
- 2017: Finland
- 2018: Poland
- 2019: Norway
- 2020: Canada
- 2026: Sweden

== German Jazz Expo and the German Jazz Journalism Award ==
Since 2012, jazzahead! has also included a German Jazz Expo and German Jazz Journalism Award. The German Jazz Expo is an export forum for German jazz, supported by the Initiative Musik gGmbH. During jazzahead!, the German jazz scene presents itself in its wide diversity with the aim to make new contacts, especially abroad.

The German Jazz Journalism Award is endowed with 5000 Euro with support by the Hamburg-based Dr. E.A. Langner-Stiftung. Previous awardees include Stefan Hentz (2019), Martin Laurentius (2017), Wolf Kampmann (2015), Ralf Dombrowski (2013) and Hans-Jürgen Linke (2012). From 2014 on, the award is presented biennially.

== jazzahead!-Award ==
Worth 15,000 Euro, the jazzahead! Award has been awarded to distinguished personalities from the international jazz business and honors their outstanding work promoting jazz as object of cultural value. This jazz prize was sponsored by motor vehicle manufacturer Škoda until 2014.

- 2014 – Jan Persson, photo journalist
- 2013 – Han Bennink, musician, percussionist
- 2012 – Siggi Loch, music manager, producer and founder of jazz label ACT
- 2011 – Claude Nobs, organizer of the Montreux Jazz Festival
- 2010 – John McLaughlin, British jazz guitarist
- 2009 – Norma Winstone, British jazz singer
- 2008 – Karsten Jahnke, German concert promoter
- 2007 – Joe Zawinul, Austrian jazz musician
- 2006 – Manfred Eicher, producer of ECM Records

== See also ==
- Jazz in Germany
