= Bert Noglik =

German jazz-journalist and music critic

Bert Noglik (born 20 May 1948) is a German jazz journalist and music critic.

== Life ==
Born in Leipzig, Noglik studied cultural studies at the University of Leipzig and received his doctorate on environmental design in urban space in 1974. He has been a freelance publicist since 1977. From 1976 to 1979, he was the first German correspondent of the Polish magazine Jazz Forum and edited its German edition in Warsaw in 1980/1. Noglik has written numerous articles for specialist journals, anthologies, symposia as well as radio broadcasts for various radio stations such as the Mitteldeutscher Rundfunk and the Deutschlandfunk. Since the beginning of the nineties, he has been a jazz judge at the Preis der deutschen Schallplattenkritik.

From 1992 to 2007, Noglik was artistic director of the Leipziger Jazztage. In this function, he developed musical-scenic projects (for example, Survival Songs with David Moss and Jeanne Lee, Bach Now with Joachim Kühn and the Thomanerchor). Noglik is an internationally sought-after expert on contemporary jazz and improvised music for symposia and competitions. Since 1999, he has organised the Bach reflections in Jazz at the Leipzig Bach Festival.

On 19 September 2008, Noglik received the Silver Cross of Merit of the Republic of Poland in recognition of his coverage of Polish Jazz since the 1970s and his promotion of artistic exchange as director of the Leipziger Jazztage, who 2005 edition was dedicated exclusively to Poland.In 2009, he initiated the festival series in Berlin Sounds no walls.

From 2012 until 2014, Noglik was artistic director of the JazzFest Berlin.

== Publications ==
- Bert Noglik, Heinz-Jürgen Lindner: Jazz im Gespräch. Verlag Neue Musik, Berlin 1978, 2nd edition 1979, Conversations with 12 jazz musicians of the GDR (with biographical data).
- Bert Noglik: Jazzwerkstatt International. Verlag Neue Musik 1981, Rowohlt Taschenbuch, Reinbek 1983, ISBN 3-499-17791-9.
- Bert Noglik: Klangspuren: Wege improvisierter Musik. Fischer Taschenbuch Verlag, Frankfurt 1992, ISBN 3-596-10812-8.
- Bert Noglik: Peitz und der Feuerschlucker vom Centre Pompidou, pp. 22–43, in Ulli Blobel (ed.): Woodstock am Karpfenteich: Die Jazzwerkstatt Peitz. Verlag jazzwerkstatt, Federal Agency for Civic Education, Bonn 2011, 208 S., Ill. 1 CD-ROM, ISBN 978-3-8389-0136-7.
- Ulrich Olshausen: Im Gespräch: Bert Noglik. Wie findet man den richtigen Jazz, Herr Noglik? In the FAZ, 20 October 2012, Anfang.

== Directing work ==
- 1996: Survival Songs – Scenic opera for five voices and virtual orchestra with Sussan Deihim, Jeanne Lee, Sainkho Namtchylak, Phil Minton, Conny Bauer, Gunter Hampel, Frank Schulte and Yoshihide Otomo. Konzeption und Regie: Bert Noglik and David Moss. premiered in the Opernhaus Leipzig, Dresden and in the Berliner Ensemble.
- 1998: Capetown Traveller – Music opera with Abdullah Ibrahim and Ensemble, Frank Schulte, Lauren Newton und Timbre. Direction: Bert Noglik. Premiere in the Opernhaus Leipzig.
- 2008: JazzJandl. Der Dichter Ernst Jandl und seine unheimliche Liebe zum Jazz. – Radio play commissioned by the Mitteldeutscher Rundfunk. With Frank Schulte (field recording and electronic composition) and Lauren Newton, voice. Directed by Bert Noglik. Broadcast 2009 on Deutschlandfunk, Bayerischer Rundfunk (BR), Südwestrundfunk (SWR), Westdeutscher Rundfunk (WDR).

Interviews

- "Ekstase ist alles." In the Tagesspiegel, 31 October 2012.
- Netzwerke sinnlicher Erfahrung. In Goethe-Institut, October 2012.
