= Ernst Petzold =

Ernst Petzold (27 March 1930 – 21 January 2017) was a German Lutheran theologian and pastor. He was the father of Martin Petzold, a tenor.

== Career ==
Born in Leipzig, Petzold attended the Thomasschule from 1940 to 1948 and was a member of the Thomanerchor under Günther Ramin. Until the spring of 1951, he sang as a guest with the boys' choir.

After Gymnasium, he studied Protestant theology at the University of Leipzig. He served as pastor in Mutzschen-Ragewitz from 1955 to 1959, then at the church St. Afra in Meissen. From 1965 he was director of the State Office for Church Home Mission and representative of the Agency of the Lutheran Church of Saxony. In 1976 he took the position of Director of Social Service Agency of the Protestant churches in the GDR. In 1981 he completed his dissertation "Eschatologie als Impuls und als Korrektiv für den Dienst der rettenden Liebe, dargestellt an der Theologie Johann Hinrich Wicherns" eschatology as impulse and as a corrective for the service of the saving love, shown in the theology of Johann Hinrich Wichern. From 1990 to 1995 he was vice-president of the charitable organisation Diakonisches Werk of the Protestant Church in Berlin. From 1988 to 1992 he was president of the "Internationaler Verbandes für Innere Mission und Diakonie" (International Association for Inner Mission and Charity), called from 1989 "Europäischer Verband für Diakonie" (European Association for Charity).

Petzold was instrumental to help the church's charity organisation even in the difficult times in East Germany. He was especially active in the help to handicapped people. After the unification of Germany, he worked towards a unification of the organisations in East and West.
