= Gruppen for Alternativ Musik =

Gruppen for Alternativ Musik (The Group for Alternative Music) was a Danish organization formed in Copenhagen in 1972. Founded by Birgitte Alsted and other young composers and performers, the group promoted forms of new music outside of the traditional forms. The group experimented with alternative forms and collective improvisation and performed the members' own compositions in unusual places, such as the Nørreport Station and Copenhagen Zoo. The group was disbanded in 1976.
