= Werner Wolf Glaser =

German-born Swedish composer, conductor and pianist (1910–2006)

Werner Wolf Glaser (14 April 1910 – 29 March 2006, in Västerås, Sweden) was a German-born Swedish composer, conductor, pianist, professor, music critic, and poet.

== Life ==
Born in Cologne, Glaser studied piano, conducting, and composition at the Cologne Conservatory, and art history afterwards in Bonn. He finally continued his studies in composition with Paul Hindemith in Berlin, where he also took courses in psychology. From 1929 to 1931, he worked as a conductor at the Chemnitz Opera and went to Cologne in 1932 to conduct choirs. Persecuted by the Nazis due to his Jewish descent, he fled Germany for Paris in 1933. He subsequently moved to Lyngby, Denmark and lectured at the Frederiksbergs Folkemusikhojskole in Copenhagen. In 1939, he opened a School of Music in Lyngbby with composer Irene Skovgaard. Glaser collaborated with Skovgaard and her brother Hjalte Skovgaard on several publications. He escaped during the rescue of the Danish Jews to Sweden in 1943. In Sweden, he conducted the Södra Västmanlands Orkesterförbund from 1944 to 1959 and also directed the Västerås Musikskola, where his colleagues included Ivar Andrén and Gunnar Axén, until 1975. He also wrote music reviews and poems for the regional daily Vestmanlans Läns Tidning. He died in 2006 and was buried in the Jewish Cemetery in Stockholm.

Glaser left an extensive oeuvre which spanned many different genres. His tonal language revealed the influence of Hindemith, but he also developed his individual style.

== Selected works ==
=== Orchestral ===
- Symphony No. 1, op. 10 (1933–34)
- Symphony No. 3 (1936–40)
- Trilogy for Orchestra No. 1 (1939)
- 5 Pieces for Orchestra (1940–42)
- Symphony No. 4 (1943)
- 2 Short Orchestral Pieces (1945)
- Prelude for Orchestra (1947)
- Symphony No. 5 (1947–49)
- Idyll, Elegy and Fanfare for Orchestra (1954)
- Symphony No. 6 Sinfonia breve della transparenza (1955–57)
- Concerto for Orchestra No. 2 (1957)
- Sorgmusik över en flicka for String Orchestra (1957)
- Symphony No. 7 Azione tardante (1959)
- Symphony No. 8 Fyra dans-scener (Four Dance Scenes) (1964)
- Violin Concerto (1964)
- Concerto for Orchestra No. 3 Conflitti (1965–66)
- Förvandlingar (Transformations) for Orchestra (1966)
- Paradosso I for String Orchestra (1967)
- 3 Symphonic Dances for Orchestra (1975)
- Symphony No. 9 (1976)
- Adagio for Strings Ruhe und Unruhe (1977)
- Symphony No. 10 (1979–80)
- Trilogy for Orchestra No. 2 (1981)
- Symphony No. 11 (1983)
- Nigeria (1986), suite based on ancient Nigerian sculptures
- Theme and Variations (1987)
- Symphony No. 13 (1990)
- Baritone saxophone Concerto (1992)

=== Chamber music ===
- Sonata for viola and piano (1939)
- The Birds Sing: 20 Canons (1939) (for recorder; with Hjalte Skovgaard, text by Irene Skovgaard)
- Gamle man (1943) for voice and piano
- Dansvisa (1945) for voice and piano
- Tranquillo for violin (or flute) and viola (1946)
- Tyra fragment for two violins (1948), recorded by Duo Gelland for Nosag
- Allegro, Cadenza e Adagio for saxophone and piano (1950)
- Capriccio No.2 for viola and piano (1963)
- Duo for two violins (1966), recorded by Duo Gelland for Nosag
- Ordo Meatus (1967) for oboe d'amore
- Serioso (1969) for oboe and harpsichord
- Absurt divertimento (1974) for soprano and wind quintet
- Sommar (1975) for soprano and flute
- Sommar (Version 2, 1976) for voice and piano
- Marsch i skrattspegel (1976) for wind quintet
- Per Sylvestrum (1977) for flute and piano
- Fågelliv (Vie d'oiseau) (1980), three pieces for soprano and string trio
- Pensieri for viola solo (1981)
- Fanfara per ASEA (1983) for 3 trumpets and timpani
- Solo for Euphonium

=== Concert band ===
- Concerto della Capella (1960) for symphonic winds and piano
- Concerto for Concert Band (1966)
- Marsch i blåsväder) (1974)
- Symphony for Wind Instruments (1980)
- 3 Pieces for 11 Saxophones (1981) for 2 soprano, 4 alto, 2 tenor, 2 baritone, and 1 bass saxophones

=== Choral ===
- Der Tod ist groß (1936) for mixed choir
- Melankolians visor Suite (1963)
- Dagen Suite (1964)
- Årskrets (1967) for children's choir
- Vårmosaik (1968) for mixed choir and string quartet

=== Stage ===
- Persefone (1960), ballet in 3 acts
- En naken kung (1971), opera in 2 acts
- Möten (1970), chamber opera for vocal soloists, flute, clarinet, and string orchestra
- Les cinq pas de l'homme (1973), ballet

=== Cantatas, and religious music ===
- Tystnad (1966), cantata for soprano, flute, alto saxophone, bass clarinet, drums, gong, violin, cello, and reel-to-reel
- Porten (1968), Advent cantata for soprano and organ
- En aftonkantat (1973), cantata for vocal soloists, two mixed choirs, flute, clarinet, horn, and organ
- Meditationspsalm (1972) for mixed voices and organ
