= Birgitte Alsted =

Danish musician (born 1942)

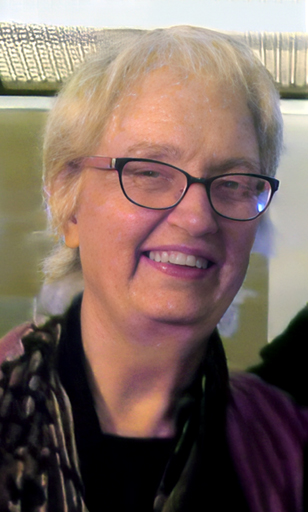
Birgitte Alsted

Birgitte Alsted (born 15 June 1942) is a Danish violinist, teacher and composer.

== Life and career ==
Alsted was born in Odense, and was educated at the Royal Danish Academy of Music and in Warsaw.

She has done much within the electronic music and often uses creative expressions, which includes other forms. Thus, she has been a part in theater and performance / dance in Denmark. Her work list, besides the music theater includes works for soloists and chamber ensembles, often unconventional compositions and the use of acoustic instruments.

Birgitte Alsted also worked some with multimedia performances in which the use of electronic resources, poetry, dance and slides have been compounded in experimental fashion. Literature and poetry, both old and new have been an important source of inspiration for her.

Birgitte Alsted was a founder of the "Gruppen for Alternativ Musik", which was important for her career as a composer. The group experimented with alternative forms and collective improvisation and performed the members' own compositions in unusual places, such as the Nørreport Station and Copenhagen Zoo.

Alsted has worked as a teacher in Hørsholm municipality in St. Annæ Gymnasium and in Copenhagen. In addition, she has been a violinist in the Danish National Symphony Orchestra.

== Works ==
- 1988: Vækst
- 1995: Sorgsang II
- 1996: Sorgsang V
- 2001: Zweigeigen
- 2002: Zu versuchen, die Fragen
- 2002: Odysseus on a Minicruise
- 2006: Dance with Bells

== Recordings ==
- Nyvang and Alsted: Planetarium Music includes Sorgsang II (Lament II) (1995) by Alsted. Da Capo Marco Polo CD 8.224083 (1997)
- Zweigeigen (2001) with Duo Gelland. Nosag records CD 152 (2007)
