= Bernd Franke (composer) =

German composer

Bernd Franke (born 14 January 1959) is a German composer.

== Career ==
Franke was born in Weißenfels/Saale. From 1975 to 1981, he studied musical composition in Leipzig at the University of Music and Theatre Leipzig with Siegfried Thiele and conducting with Wolf-Dieter Hauschild. As a founder, he presided over the "Junge Musik" group in Leipzig from 1980 to 1983. From 1981 to 1985 he was a master student at the Akademie der Künste der DDR in Berlin and in 1988 a participant in the "Composer Workshop of the Gaudeamus Foundation Amsterdam", where he worked with Ton de Leeuw and Chu Wen Chung, among others. Later, in 1989, Franke was able to deepen his studies at the "Leonard Bernstein Fellowship of the Tanglewood Music Center". There he worked not only with Leonard Bernstein, but also with composer Lukas Foss, violinist Louis Krasner and composer and conductor Oliver Knussen. As an acclaimed composer, various lecture and concert tours in 1993, 1994 and 1996 took him to Atlanta, Baton Rouge, Carrollton, Jacksonville and Minneapolis. At the invitation of Hans Werner Henze, Franke was a jury member of the "Munich Biennale for New Music Theatre in 1994. For two years (1996–1998), he was also artistic director of the series "New Music in the Beck Gallery" Leipzig/Düsseldorf. The year 1998 is associated with the founding of the "Ensemble SOLO XFACH", so important for Bernd Franke, which has since aimed at the authentic dissemination of the works of Franke's cycle "SOLO XFACH", begun in 1988.

Since the 1990s, Franke has worked intensively with the Goethe Institutes in New York, Toronto, Helsinki, Prague, Vilnius, Atlanta and Pittsburgh, among others. Since 2002 he has also been a member of the "Akademie der Künste" in Dresden and has been teaching at the University of Leipzig from 1981 to 2026. In 2003, Franke became adjunct professor at the Alma mater lipsiensis (University of Leipzig). He gave master classes and lectures (among others at the Manhattan School of Music in New York, the Sibelius Academy Helsinki, the Pitea Festival Sweden or also the Music Academy Prague and the Music Academy Vilnius/Lithuania). 2008/09 Composer in Residence at ARS NOVA Copenhagen and Paul Hillier. 2009 Composer in Residence in Lithuania/Kurische Nehrung at the festival "Land of Disobedience".

His works are published by C. F. Peters, Breitkopf & Härtel, Faber Music London and Hofmeister Musikverlag, since 2002 exclusively by C. F. Peters.

== Work ==
- Piano
  - ITER MAGNETICUM (I), for piano four hands (1990)
  - For WOLS (It's all over), four pieces for piano (1991)
  - ... in Annäherung, for piano solo (1997/98)
- Chamber music
  - Quartet for clarinet, viola, double bass and percussion (1977/78)
  - 3 × Virtuosos, for 2 × 1 percussionist (1982)
  - Chagall-Impressions, 6 pieces for 10 brass players (1985)
  - "Time is a river without a bank" – 6 × Chagall for 10 instruments (1985/86)
  - "Konform – Kontraform", scene for 8 instruments (1988)
  - Music for wind quintet in five movements (1989)
  - Music for violin, violoncello and piano (Hope as a breath...) (1992)
  - Seasons of Light (for Richard Pousette-Dart), for bassoon and ensemble (1994)
  - "ATTEMPT AT CLOSENESS" – Fragments for string quartet (in memory of Louis Krasner) (1999–2000)
  - "Prambanan", for bassoon and piano (2000)
  - CANZONI (1), for brass ensemble (1999–2001)
  - CUT I (for Manfred H. Wenninger), for electric guitar, horn, trumpet, trombone, percussion and piano (2001)
  - CUT II (for Jean Guitton), for percussion, harp, 2 violins, viola and double bass (2001)
  - CUT III (for Eduard Goldstücker), for violoncello, oboe, clarinet, soprano saxophone and bassoon (2001)
  - "I met Feldman at the crossroad ..." (the way down is the way up), for soprano or narrator (male voice) and string quartet (2002).
  - For Elliott Carter for solo timpani (2004)
  - approaching Mahler, for brass ensemble, timpani and percussion (2005)
  - STILLE WASSER for electric guitar, electric bass and playback CD (2006)
  - in between (I), for violin and piano (2005)
  - in between (II), for piano, clarinet, trombone and violoncello (2007)
  - in between (III) for clarinet and piano (2006/07)
  - in between (IV), for 2 violins for Duo Gelland (2007)
  - in between (V) for violin and violoncello (2009)
- Orchestra
  - Three orchestral pieces (1980–83)
  - Chagall Music for Orchestra (1985–86)
  - Music for Trumpet, Harp, Violin and Orchestra (in memory of Leonard Bernstein) (1990–1993)
  - "For Shalom Ash – five pieces for orchestra" (Suite from the opera "Mottke the Thief") (1995–98/2002)
  - "open doors" for bandoneon and orchestra (2002)
  - Raschèr fanfare for saxophone orchestra (2002)
  - Three Marches for C. I. (2002)
  - "Double Life", for oboe, flute and orchestra (2003/04) Simultaneous version of CUT IV for flute and ensemble (for Joanna Pousette-Dart) and CUT V for oboe and ensemble (for Philip Roth)
  - "BlueGreen", for saxophone quartet and orchestra (2004)
  - Cut VI-VIII (for Colin McPhee, for J.S.B. and for Hans Werner Henze) (2005–2006)
  - On The Square for Orchestra (2006/07)
  - Yellow clouds for string orchestra (2009)
- Vocal music
  - Jodok läßt grüßen (oder: Etüde über O), spoken chorus for mixed voices on a text by Peter Bichsel (1990)
  - "Time is a ...", performance and ritual for voices (soprano, alto, tenor, bass) and piano (1999)
  - "Broken Proximity, scene for baritone and orchestra (2000)
  - BACH PERSONAE – five voices in today's world (world premiere 2000)
  - Significatio – Carlo Gesualdo, cinque madrigali a cinque voci (2001)
  - unseen blue for voices and bandoneon (2002)
  - PETREL SEASCAPES, five songs for soprano and orchestra (world premiere 2002)
  - lines (I), for soprano and ensemble (2004)
  - lines (II) for boy solo/soprano, double bass and ensemble (2007)
  - On the Dignity of Man, for mixed choir and saxophone quartet (2004 / 2005)
  - Rilke-Madrigals, for mixed choir (2005)
  - Miletus for soprano, choir and orchestra (2007/08)
  - Augustusplatz for choir, electric bass, percussion and glockenspiel (2009)
  - Memoriam – Tempo e tempi for choir and orchestra (2008/09)
- Stage work
  - Mottke der Dieb, Opera in two acts, freely adapted from the novel Motke Fanev [Motke the Thief] by Shalom Ash, libretto by Jonathan Moore (1995–98)
- The cycle "half-way house – SOLO XFACH (for Joseph Beuys)"
  - ... in approximation, for piano solo (1997/98) (solo version)
  - Solo 2 – in Annäherung (I), for flute (Picc. Fl. Afl. Bfl. ) and piano (1997)
  - Solo 2 parts – in approximation (II), for oboe (Ob. Ehr. Ob. d`amore) and piano (1997/98)
  - Solo 2-times – in approximation (III), for viola and piano (1997/98)
  - Solo 2fach – in Annäherung (IV), for bass clarinet and piano (1997/2001)
  - Solo 3fach – for violin, horn and piano (in memory of Joseph Beuys) (1988)
  - Solo 4-fold – superimposed, for bandoneon, electric guitar, harp and violin (1999–2000)
  - Solo 5-fold – breaking, for horn, flute, oboe, clarinet and bassoon (1998/99)
  - Solo 6fach – erstarrt, for percussion ensemble (1994)
  - Solo 7x – in distance, for ensemble (Fl. Pos. Schlzg. Vl. Va. Vc. Kb. )(1996)
  - Solo 8x – in motion, for ensemble (2003)
  - Solo 9x – into infinity, for ensemble (for Erich Hauser) (2001)
  - Solo xfach – tape (I-IV) (2000)
- Various solo works
  - Gesang (I), for flute/bass flute solo (1988)
  - Gesang (II), for trumpet solo (1989)
  - ...on G..., for trumpet solo (1993)
  - For Elliott Carter, for solo timpani (2004)

== Awards ==
- Hanns Eisler Prize and Mendelssohn Scholarship (1981)
- Hans Stieber Prize (1987)
- Composition Prize for the 9th International Composition Seminar of the Künstlerhaus Boswil (Switzerland) foundation
- Kucyna International Composition Prize, Boston, SA (1987)
- Composer of the Year at the Kaustinen Festival in Finland (2003)
