= Mitteldeutsche Kammerphilharmonie =

German orchestra

The Mitteldeutsche Kammerphilharmonie is the "house orchestra" of the Salzlandkreis in Saxony-Anhalt and emerged in 1991 from the Staatliches Kulturorchester Schönebeck founded in 1948.

== History ==
The Mitteldeutsche Kammerphilharmonie was founded in 1948 as Staatliches Kulturorchester Schönebeck in Schönebeck an der Elbe. The 25 musicians from over nine nations play all styles from Baroque, Romantic music, Operette, Neue Musik, jazz bis pop music and perform in more than 100 events every year.

The orchestra plays in Dr. Tolberg Hall in Bad Salzelmen, the Carl Maria von Weber Theater in Bernburg, the Salzland Theater in Staßfurt, and the Gesellschaftshaus Magdeburg.

In addition to well-known musicians such as Igor Oistrakh, Lars Karlin, Dimitri Ashkenazy, Jule Rosalie Vortisch, Stephan König, Michael Collins, Valentina Babor, Andy Miles, Lothar Hensel, Juliane Behrens, Christian Brembeck, Elena Tkachenko, Yury Revich and Ingrid Kaiserfeld, young, highly talented artists also make guest appearances time and again such as soloists like Sergej Zimmermann (violin) and Nikolai Erpilev (trumpet) with the orchestra

Among others, tours have taken the orchestra to France, Cuba, South Africa, Poland, Lithuania, the Czech Republic, Scandinavia and the Netherlands.

The cultural highlight since 1997 has been the annual Schönebecker Operettensommer on the open-air stage of the Bierer Berg near Schönebeck.

Other projects include the annual music festival Klänge im Raum with numerous children's and youth concerts, as well as CD recordings. Radio and television recordings with the NDR, the Mitteldeutscher Rundfunk and the Deutschlandradio Kultur.

In 2014, the orchestra performed at the Walkenrieder Kreuzgangkonzertes, among others.

== Conductors ==
- Kurt Hennemann (1948–1970)
- Günther Wendemuth (1970–1990)
- Rolf Stadler (1992–1996)
- Stefanos Tsialis (1996–2005)
- Christian Simonis (2005–2013)
- Gerard Oskamp (2013–2019)
- Jan Michael Horstmann (since 2019)

== Recording (selection) ==
- Joaquín Rodrigo: Spanish night – concertos for 1, 2 and 4 guitars & orchestra (Hänssler, 2000)
- Dieter Salbert: 3 Romanzen für Saxophon und Streicher (D. Karsch, Mathias Sorof, 2003)
- Raven – works by Mikis Theodorakis and Harald Genzmer (Holger Busse, 2004)
- Wolfgang Amadeus Mozart, Franz Liszt, Joaquín Rodrigo, Frédéric Chopin, Felix Mendelssohn Bartholdy, Robert Schumann: Zeit zu zweit (Hänssler, 2006)
