= Frank-Steffen Elster =

German choral director

Frank-Steffen Elster (born 1976) is a German choral director.

== Life ==
Born in Leipzig, Elster sang in the Gewandhaus Children's Choir and Youth Choir under the Choir Director Ekkehard Schreiber and took over musical assistant duties and provisional rehearsals of the Gewandhaus Choirs at an early age. From 1997 to 2002, he studied at the University of Music and Theatre Leipzig then choral conducting, conducting and singing at the University of Music and Theatre Leipzig. As assistant to the director of the Gewandhaus Choir Morten Schuldt-Jensen, he took over the direction of the children's choir in 1999. In 1997, he founded the ensemble avelarte, which he directed until 2007. In 2007, he was appointed choir director of the Stadtsingechor zu Halle, and in 2011 he also took over the artistic direction of the Singakademie Halle. In collaboration with the director Philipp J. Neumann, he composed music for feature films and theatre productions.

In 2012 he was featured in the docu-soap Advent in XXL.

In March 2014, he resigned from the direction of the Stadtsingechor Halle for personal reasons and in April 2014 also ended his work as artistic director of the Singakademie Halle. Elster ist Dozent für Chorleitung an der Hochschule für Musik und Theater Leipzig.
