= Kerstin Jeppsson =

Swedish composer (born 1948)

Kerstin Jeppsson (born 29 October 1948) is a Swedish composer.

She was born in Nyköping, Sweden, and graduated from the Royal College of Music in Stockholm, where she studied composition with Maurice Karkoff. She received a fellowship to continue her studies at the Kraków Conservatory, where she studied with Krzysztof Meyer and Krzysztof Penderecki for composition and Jozef Radwan for conducting. Jeppsson received a bachelor of arts degree from the Stockholm University in 1977, and graduated with a Master of Fine Arts from the California Institute of the Arts in Santa Clarita in 1979, where she studied with Mel Powell for composition and Daniel Schulman for conducting.

== Works ==
Jeppsson has composed vocal compositions, instrumental works and chamber music, many of which have been recorded. Recorded works include:

- 4 småstycken En dröm
- Percussione con forza
- Prometheus
- Embrio
- Stråkkvartett no. 2
- I förändring Lyrics: Ulla Olin
- Impossibile Lyrics: Göran Sonnevi
- I Till Dig Lyrics: Karin Boye
- I Rosen Lyrics: Edith Södergran
- III Gå ut i skogen Lyrics: Ulla Olin
- II Ovetande Lyrics: Ulla Olin
- III Kärleksdikt Lyrics: Elsa Grave
- II Upptäckt Lyrics: Edith Södergran
- II Du är min renaste tröst Lyrics: Karin Boye
- III De mörka änglarna Lyrics: Karin Boye

Jeppsson's works have been issued on CD, including:

- Kerstin Jeppsson String Quartet No 2, Embrio (Phono Suecia) ASIN: B000O0575Y
- Percussione con forza (2000-05-31), Anders Blomqvist & Anders Hultqvist & Kerstin Jeppsson & Christer Lindwall & Kent Olofsson & Karin Rehnqvist
- Canto cromatico per due violini (2003), Duo Gelland, Nosag records CD 121
