= Jenaer Philharmonie =

German symphony orchestra based in Jena

The Jenaer Philharmonie is a German symphony orchestra based in Jena, Germany. The orchestra performs its concerts principally at the Volkshaus Jena, in the Ernst Abbe Saal.

== History ==
The orchestra was founded in 1934 with the intent to revive and continue the old traditions of the "Collegium musicum Jenense" and the academic concerts by the Friedrich Schiller University of Jena (Friedrich-Schiller-Universität Jena). In 1953 it became a symphonic orchestra and acquired its present-day status of philharmonic orchestra in 1969. It is the largest independent symphony orchestra in the central German state of Thuringia.

In addition to the orchestra, the Philharmonic Choir (Philharmonischer Chor Jena), the Boys' Choir (Knabenchor der Jenaer Philharmonie), and the Jena Madrigal Choir (Jenaer Madrigalkreis) are parts of the Jenaer Philharmonie. The current Intendant of the orchestra is Bruno Scharnberg.

Ernst Schwaßmann was the orchestra's first Generalmusikdirektor (General Music Director, GMD), from 1934 to 1945. Andrey Boreyko, GMD from 1998 to 2003, now has the title of Ehrendirigent (honorary conductor) with the orchestra. Boreyko conducted the orchestra in commercial recordings for such labels as Teldec. In April 2012, the orchestra appointed the American conductor Marc Tardue as its next GMD, effective September 2012. Tardue concluded his tenure with the orchestra in 2017.

In May 2017, the orchestra announced the appointment of Simon Gaudenz as its next GMD, effective with the 2018–2019 season. In November 2022, the orchestra announced the extension of Gaudenz's contract as GMD through the 2025–2026 season. In March 2024, the orchestra announced a further extension of Gaudenz's contract through the 2028–2029 season.

The orchestra has made commercial recordings for such labels as Teldec and CPO, including music of Liszt and Wagner for the latter.

== Generalmusikdirektoren (GMD; general music directors) ==
- Ernst Schwaßmann (1934–1945)
- Carl Ferrand (1945–1947)
- Albert Müller (1947–1949)
- Gerhard Hergert (1950–1959)
- Hans Heinrich Schmitz (1959–1966)
- Günter Blumhagen (1967–1980)
- Christian Ehwald (1981–1988)
- Andreas Weiser (1990–1998)
- Andrey Boreyko (1998–2004)
- Nicholas Milton (2004–2011)
- Marc Tardue (2011–2017)
- Simon Gaudenz (2018–present)
