= Akademisches Orchester Leipzig =

German amateur symphonic Orchestra

The Akademische Orchester Leipzig is an amateur symphony orchestra based in Leipzig. It was founded in 1954 by the conductor Horst Förster as the Collegium musicum of the University of Leipzig and was part of the University until 1991. Alongside other cultural institutions, it was subordinate to the university's "Main Department of Culture". At the time of reunification, the university separated from its orchestra, and since then it has no longer been an official part of the university. Instead, the Academic Orchestra reorganised itself in 1991 as a nonprofit organization. The artistic director is Horst Förster.

== Members ==
As a non-profit association, the Academic Orchestra is committed to student music-making; in addition to students from a wide range of disciplines, it also consists of numerous alumni and other academics. An affiliation to the University of Leipzig or another Leipzig university is not mandatory for the members. The members of the association play music free of charge. For various pieces, the members of the Academic Orchestra are supported by professional musicians from, among others, the Gewandhaus Orchestra, the MDR Symphony Orchestra and students of the University of Music and Theatre Leipzig.

== Concert activity ==
Since 1956, the orchestra has performed the so-called Academic Concerts six times a year. Since 1981, the performances have taken place in the Great Hall of the Gewandhaus in Leipzig. For an amateur symphony orchestra, the continuous concert activity with 6 subscription concerts annually is remarkable. The concerts have been mostly sold out for years and are occasionally supplemented by additional chamber concerts.

From the 1990s until 2010, the Academic Orchestra organised the annual matriculation ceremony of the Leipzig University of Applied Sciences.

== Abroad ==
Since 1990, the Academic Orchestra has toured abroad to France, Austria, Spain, Italy, Norway, Canada, the US and Japan. In 2008, it made its first guest appearance in China. Before the Peaceful Revolution in 1989, foreign tours led to Czechoslovakia, Hungary, Romania and Bulgaria.

== Awards ==
- 1979: Kunstpreis der Stadt Leipzig
