= Euro-scene Leipzig =

German theatre and dance festival

Euro-scene Leipzig is a contemporary European theatre and dance festival in Germany.
