= Britta Byström =

Swedish classical composer

- Born: 14 March 1977; Sundsvall, Sweden
- Occupations: Musical composer, trumpeter,
- Years active: 1993-
- Website: Official website

Britta Byström (born 14 March 1977) is a Swedish classical composer who specializes in orchestral music but has also composed vocal music and opera. In 2015, the Detroit Symphony Orchestra honoured her as the winner of the Elaine Lebenbom Memorial Award for Female Composers.

== Biography ==
Born in Sundsvall, Sweden, Britta Byström was not raised in a musical family but became interested in music at the age of 10 when she began to play the trumpet. After writing tunes for the trumpet, she started to compose for an orchestra made up of her teenage friends. By the time she was 16, she had won a competition with the Umeå Symphony Orchestra.

She was admitted to study composition at the Royal Swedish College of Music in 1995, under Pär Lindgren and Bent Sørensen, graduating in 2001. She has since composed more than 100 works, some of which have been performed by the BBC Symphony Orchestra, the Gürzenich orchestra and the Danish National Symphony Orchestra. Some of her compositions have been written directly for soloists such as Radovan Vlatkovic, Malin Broman, Rick Stotijn and Janine Jansen.

Several of Byström's works have attracted particular attention. Der Vogel der Nacht (The Bird of the Night) was inspired by Gustav Mahler's Third Symphony. It was first performed by the Swedish Radio Orchestra in 2010. The tone poem Picnic at Hanging Rock, described by Byström as "music with disappearance", received the Christ Johnson prize in 2012, while A Walk After Dark, a viola concerto, earned the Da-capo award at the 2014 Brandenburger Biennale. In 2016, she composed Many, Yet One for the Detroit Symphony Orchestra. It was given its world premiere in January 2018. Parallel Universes, an orchestral work inspired by the cosmologist Max Tegmark's theories, was commissioned by BBC to celebrate the 150th anniversary of the Royal Albert Hall 2021 and was first performed by BBC Philharmonic, conductor John Storgårds at the BBC Proms 2021.

Britta Byström's music is since 2010 published by Edition Wilhelm Hansen. Since 2016, she is a member of the Royal Swedish Academy of Music.

== List of compositions ==
- De dansande figurerna för stråkkvartett (1995)
- En studie i rött för stråkorkester (1996)
- Horisontvals för stor orkester (1996)
- Dans på de saligas ängder för trumpet och slagverk/vibrafon (1996–97)
- Två passacaglior för symfoniorkester (1997)
- In frale barca för mezzosopran, klarinett, fagott, trumpet, trombon, 2 slagverkare, violin och kontrabas till text av Petrarca (1997–98)
- Regndans för symfoniorkester (1998)
- Serenad för flöjt, violin, violoncell och piano (1999)
- Barcarole för orkester (2000)
- Divertimento för tuba och accordeon (2000)
- Stänk och flikar för klarinett och 5 slagverkare (2000)
- The Baron in the Trees för slagverk och orkester (2000–01)
- Lux aeterna för blandad kör (2001)
- Sera för orkester (2002)
- Symphony in Yellow för pianotrio (2002)
- Strapats för klarinett, piccolatrumpet violin, viola, slagverk och piano (2002)
- Weed för blåsorkester (2002)
- Om man blivit av med sitt bagage, kammaropera med libretto av Niklas Törnlund (2003)
- Persuasion för orkester (2004)
- La fugitive för brasskvintett (2004)
- Förvillelser (Delusions), trumpetkonsert nr 1 (2005)
- Avskedsvariationer (Farewell Variations) för orkester (2005)
- Lyckans land för violin och orkester (2006)
- Es ist genug för 6 slagverkare och sinfonietta (2007)
- Strövtåg i hembygden för 6 stråkar (2007)
- Konsert för orkester (2007–08)
- Revolt i grönska för flöjt, klarinett, slagverk, piano, violin, viola, cello (2008)
- I tornet (In the Tower) för brasskvintett (2008–09)
- Allt beror på vingar för blandad kör och orkester till text av Niklas Törnlund (2009)
- Picnic at Hanging Rock (Utflykt i det okända) för orkester (2009)
- Der Vogel der Nacht för orkester (2010)
- Brev i april (Letter in April) för klarinett, violin, cello och piano (2011)
- Inferno för brasskvintett och recitation (2011)
- Kinderszenen för horn, piano och violin (2011)
- Ten Secret Doors för orkester (2011)
- Screen Mamories, trumpetkonsert nr 2 (2012)
- A Walk after Dark, violakonsert (2013)
- Dream Day för soloviola (2013)
- Invisible Cities för orkester (2013)
- Yankadi för violin, cello, oboe, fagott, trumpet, trombon och orkester (2013)
- Inte-nudda-golv för stråktrio (2014)
- Nátt i býnum för blandad kör (2014)
- Segelnde Stadt för orkester (2014)
- Tinta för 4 tromboner (2014)
- Encounter in Space för trumpet, klarinett och piano (2014)
- Gállábartnit – sceniskt verk för solister, kör, dansare och septett (2015)
- A Walk on Green Streets för flöjt, klarinett, slagverk, piano, violin, viola, cello (2015)
- Baum in der Stadt för soloviolin (2015)
- Games For Souls för violin och stråkorkester (2015)
- Games For Souls – shortened version för violin och stråkorkester (2015)
- Many, Yet One för orkester (2016)
- Fanfare für die Verwandlung for orchestra (2016)
- Volley for 2 violins (2016)
- Two Walks for string orchestra (2016)
- Infinite Rooms for violin, double bass and orchestra (2016)
- Nachtstück for soprano, countertenor and piano (2017)
- Love in the Afternoon for violin, cello and piano (2017)
- Diagonal musik for horn, violin and prepared piano (2017)
- A Walk to GADE for string orchestra (2017)
- A Walk to Tjajkovskij for string orchestra (2017)
- Notes From the City of the Sun for soprano and orchestra (2017)
- Lovsång till drömmarna for soprano and string orchestra (2018)
- A Walk to Värmland for wind orchestra (2018)
- Four Walks for viola and double bass (2018)
- Games Without End for French horn and orchestra (2018)
- Promenad till en högre sfär (Walk to a Higher Sphere) for orchestra (2018)
- Två sånger om liv och död (Two Songs about Life and Death) for mixed choir (2018)
