= Lukaskirche, Dresden =

Church in Dresden, Germany

Coordinates: 51°01′54″N 13°44′03″E

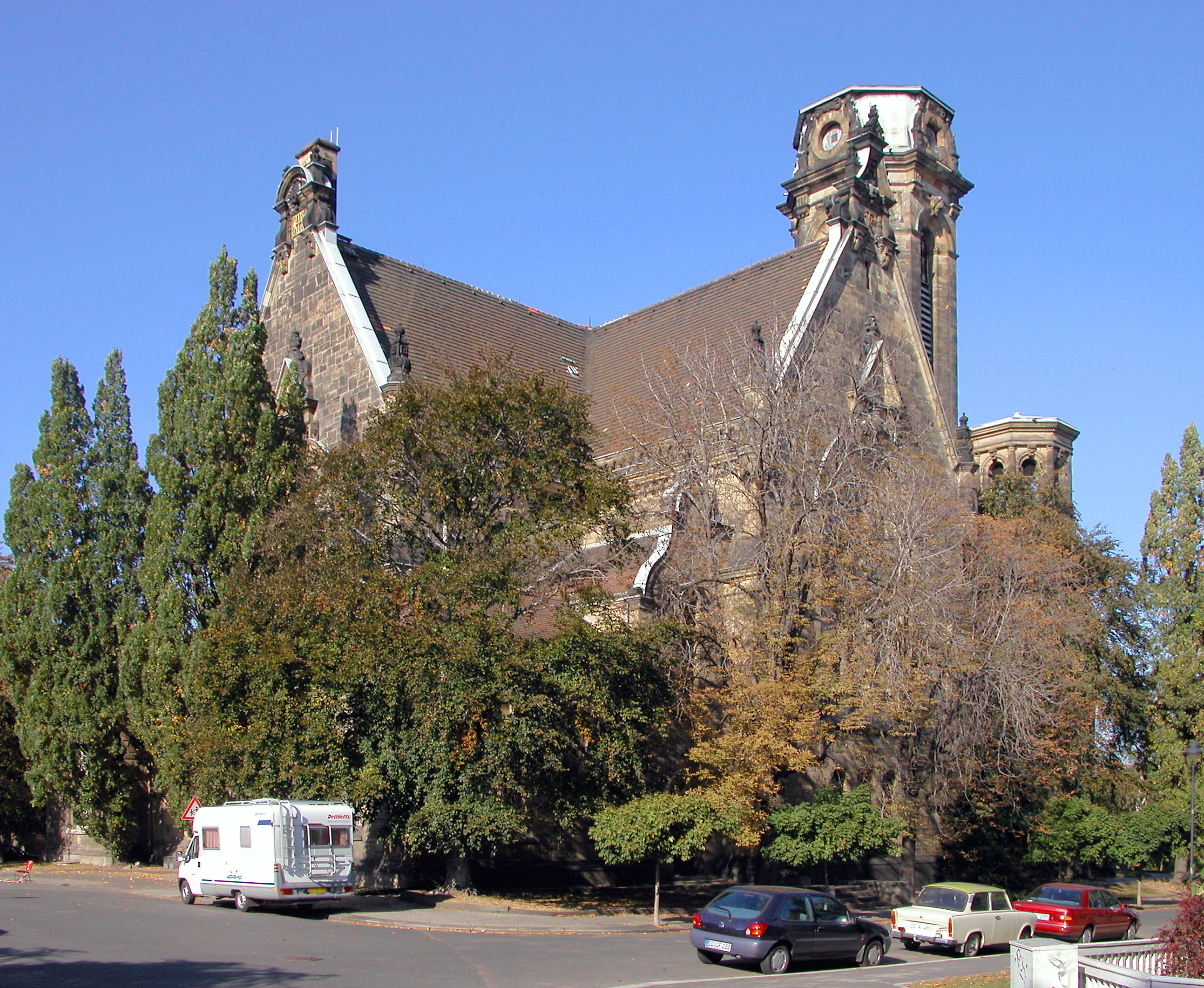
The Lukaskirche in 2003

The Lukaskirche is a church in southern Dresden, Germany.

Consecrated in 1903, the Lutheran church was designed by Georg Weidenbach. It was heavily damaged in the bombing of Dresden, during which the spire was destroyed. After the war it was used as a recording studio.
