= Volkshaus Jena =

Building in Germany

Coordinates: 50.9271°N 11.5800°E

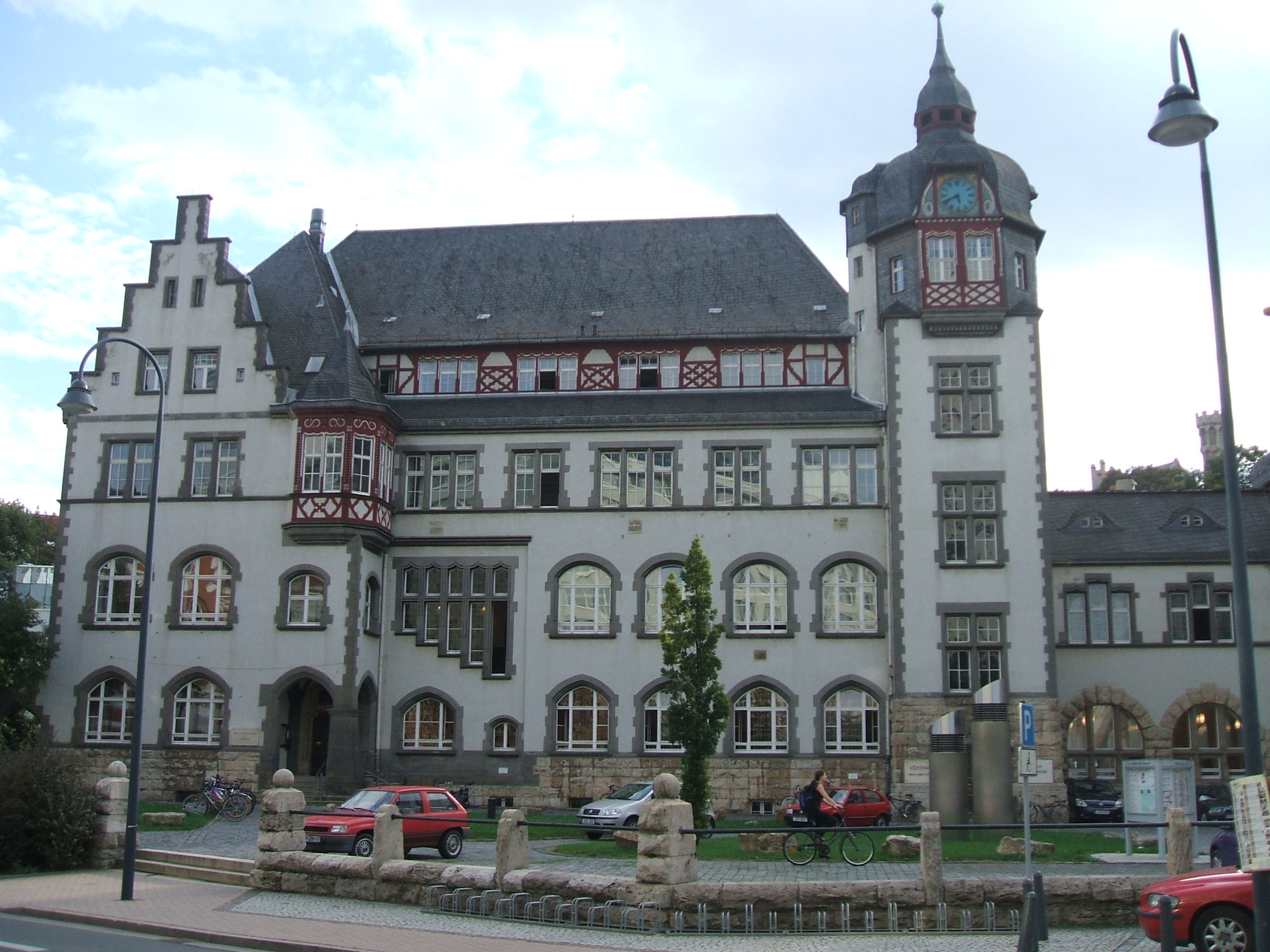
Volkshaus Jena

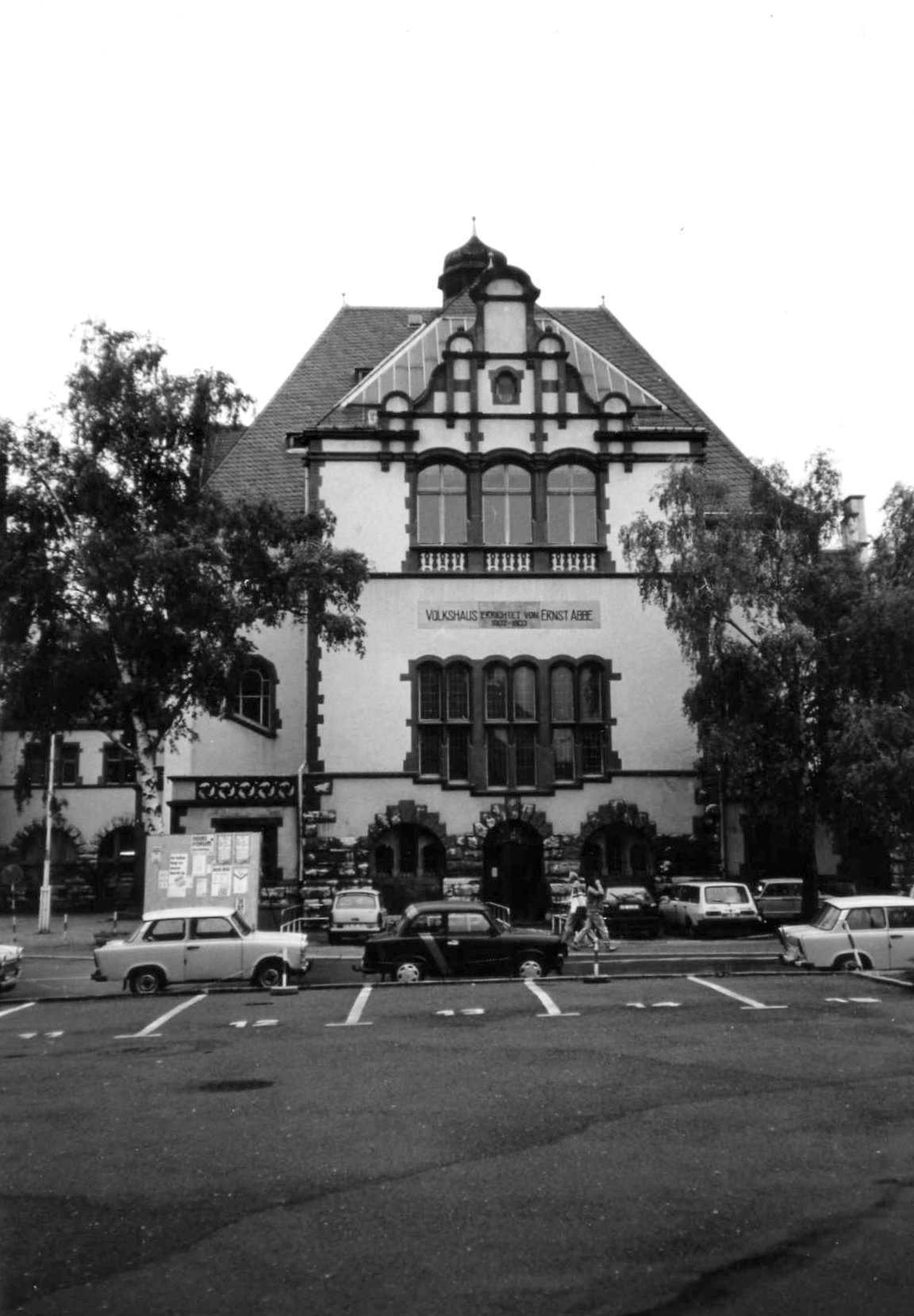
Volkshaus in 1990

The Volkshaus in Jena was one of the first free educational institutions in Germany to be set up on the North American model.

== History ==
It was built with funds from the Carl Zeiss Foundation by Arwed Roßbach and opened in 1903. Supported by the physicists Ernst Abbe and Siegfried Czapski who worked at Zeiss, as well as the publisher Eugen Diederichs, the drawing school of the painter Erich Kuithan existed here from 1903 to 1908. In 1907, the Jena Volksverein showed a selection from the 1st Graphic Exhibition of the Deutscher Künstlerbund in Leipzig in the Volkshaus.

In January 1919, the director of the Reichstag and a privy councillor sounded out possible meeting places for the Weimar National Assembly to be elected - in addition to Bayreuth, Nuremberg and the Deutsches Nationaltheater und Staatskapelle Weimar, also the Volkshaus Jena. However, the choice on 14 January 1919 fell on Weimar.

From June 1922 to October 1924, the Volkshaus Jena housed the first exhibition of optical devices, which can now be seen in the neighbouring Optical Museum Jena.

Today it is the property of the Ernst-Abbe-Stiftung. The Volkshaus Jena houses (or housed) lecture and concert halls, a library, an independent drawing school and the headquarters of the Jenaer Kunstverein

In 1987, a Sauer organ was installed in the Great Hall to replace the old organ inaugurated in 1906 by Thomas organist Karl Straube. With its 4,800 organ pipes, it is one of the largest new organs in Thuringia, has 61 registers and a movable console. The organ cost 1.5 million GDR marks, paid for by the VEB Carl Zeiss Jena. It was largely planned by the organ expert and organist Hartmut Haupt.

Today, the Volkshaus is mainly used as a meeting place with its own programme of events; in addition, there are rooms for the Ernst Abbe Library and the Jena Philharmonic Orchestra as well as various clubs.
