= Jan Michael Horstmann =

German conductor, harpsichordist

Jan Michael Horstmann (born 1968) is a German conductor, harpsichordist, pianist, moderator, director and chansonnier.

== Life and career ==
Born in Frankfurt, Horstmann completed his conducting studies at the Hochschule für Musik und Theater Hamburg with Klauspeter Seibel and was engaged as Kapellmeister at the Wuppertaler Bühnen even before completing his studies. From 1996 to 2004, he was deputy general music director at Theater Magdeburg. From March 2004 to July 2013, Horstmann was general music director of the Mittelsächsisches Theater and artistic director of the Mittelsächsische Philharmonie, from August 2012 to July 2017 opera director of the Landesbühnen Sachsen, from summer 2013 combined with the overall musical direction. Since September 2019, he has been chief conductor of the Mitteldeutsche Kammerphilharmonie in Schönebeck an der Elbe.

Horstmann has worked as a conductor for the Tanztheater Wuppertal Pina Bausch since 1992. As a guest conductor he has appeared with the orchestra of the Beethovenhalle (Bonn), the Staatstheater Kassel, the Hamburger Symphoniker and the Dresdner Philharmonie. Guest appearances have taken him to the Teatro Real Madrid, the Edinburgh Festival (Scottish Chamber Orchestra), the Holland Festival (Radio Chamber Orchestra Hilversum), as well as to the Tokyo City Philharmonic Orchestra, the Theatro Municipal do Rio de Janeiro and the Teatro Nacional Claudio Santoro in Brasília.
