= Lothar Bölck =

German cabarettist

Lothar Bölck (born 27 January 1953) is a German cabarettist, writer and director.

== Professional ==
Born in Fürstenwalde/Spree, Bölck, who studied economics, performed in various cabaret houses, such as the Magdeburg Kugelblitzen, the Leipziger Pfeffermühle and the Magdeburger Zwickmühle.

Bölck became known together with Hans-Günther Pölitz and Rainer Basedow through the MDR Fernsehen cabaret programme Die drei von der Zankstelle, in which he took part until 2006. From May 2010 until it was discontinued in 2019, he and Michael Frowin ran the new MDR programme Kanzleramt Pforte D.

== Awards ==
with the Magdeburger Zwickmühle:

- 1999: Cabinet-Preis
- 2000: Reinheimer Satirelöwe
- 2001: Lachmesse Leipzig
- 2003: Oltner Kabarett-Tage

as soloist:

- 2006: Reinheimer Satirelöwe
- 2006: Scharfe Barte, Melsungen
- 2008: Der Rostocker Koggenzieher
- 2008: Das Schwarze Schaf vom Niederrhein
