= Leipziger Jazztage =

Leipziger Jazztage is a jazz festival in Germany.
