= Martin Petzold =

German classical tenor (1955–2023)

- Born: 25 June 1955; Leipzig, East Germany
- Died: 19 April 2023 (aged 67)
- Education: Thomanerchor; University of Music and Theatre Leipzig
- Occupation: Operatic tenor
- Organizations: Landestheater Halle; Leipzig Opera
- Title: Kammersänger
- Father: Ernst Petzold
- Website: www.martinpetzold.com

Martin Petzold (25 June 1955 – 19 April 2023) was a German classical tenor who performed internationally in opera and concert. He was for decades a member of the Leipzig Opera, performing more than 80 roles such as Pedrillo in Mozart's Die Entführung aus dem Serail, David in Wagner's Die Meistersinger von Nürnberg and Toni in Henze's Elegie für junge Liebende. A member of the Thomanerchor as a boy, he was particularly known for the part of the Evangelist in oratorios and Passions of Johann Sebastian Bach.

== Career ==
In concert, Petzold collaborated with major orchestras and choirs, such as the Thomanerchor, the Dresdner Kreuzchor, the Monteverdi-Chor Hamburg, the Gewandhausorchester, the MDR Symphony Orchestra and the Freiburg Baroque Orchestra. He was focused on works by Johann Sebastian Bach, singing the part of the Evangelist in his Christmas Oratorio and Passions, conducted by Biller, Peter Schreier, Kurt Masur, Roderich Kreile, Rolf Schweizer and David Timm. He appeared in the St Matthew Passion more than 100 times, and in the Christmas Oratorio more than 300 times, saying that his respect for the works kept growing. In concert he was in demand internationally, performing in European countries, the US, in China, Israel, at the Suntory Hall in Tokyo, and in South America. He worked with conductors including Riccardo Chailly, Kurt Masur, Yehudi Menuhin, Kent Nagano and Ton Koopman. In opera, he appeared at houses such as the Teatro Nacional de São Carlos in Lisbon.

Petzold worked from 2002 as a lecturer at international master classes, and was also a vocal coach of the Thomanerchor. Petzold also worked for the preservation of German Volkslied. In 2001 he was awarded the title Kammersänger.

After retiring from the opera stage, he took to drawing humorous books about music as another passion of his youth.

== Personal life ==
Petzold was born in Leipzig, the son of the theologian Ernst Petzold. He received his first musical education as a member of the Thomanerchor, where he was a member from 1965 to 1974, at the same time as Georg Christoph Biller. His father, his brother and later his son Jakob were also choir members. As Petzold initially refused to join the army, the East German authorities denied him the right to study music. He entered a seminary and began an apprenticeship as an art smith and. He served in the military for 18 months and then studied voice from 1979 to 1985 at the University of Music and Theatre Leipzig with Eva Schubert and Bernd Siegfried Weber. He wanted to sing in an opera chorus, but while still a student was engaged as a soloist in Halberstadt and Altenburg. In 1985 he became a member of the Landestheater Halle. He appeared regularly at the Leipzig Opera from 1986, and became a permanent member of the ensemble in 1988. He performed more than 80 roles, including David in Wagner's Die Meistersinger von Nürnberg, Pedrillo in Mozart's Die Entführung aus dem Serail, Toni in Henze's Elegie für junge Liebende, Flaut in Ein Sommernachtstraum and Ivan in Shostakovich's Die Nase.

Petzold died on 19 April 2023, at age 67.
