= Philharmonisches Staatsorchester Halle =

German symphonic orchestra

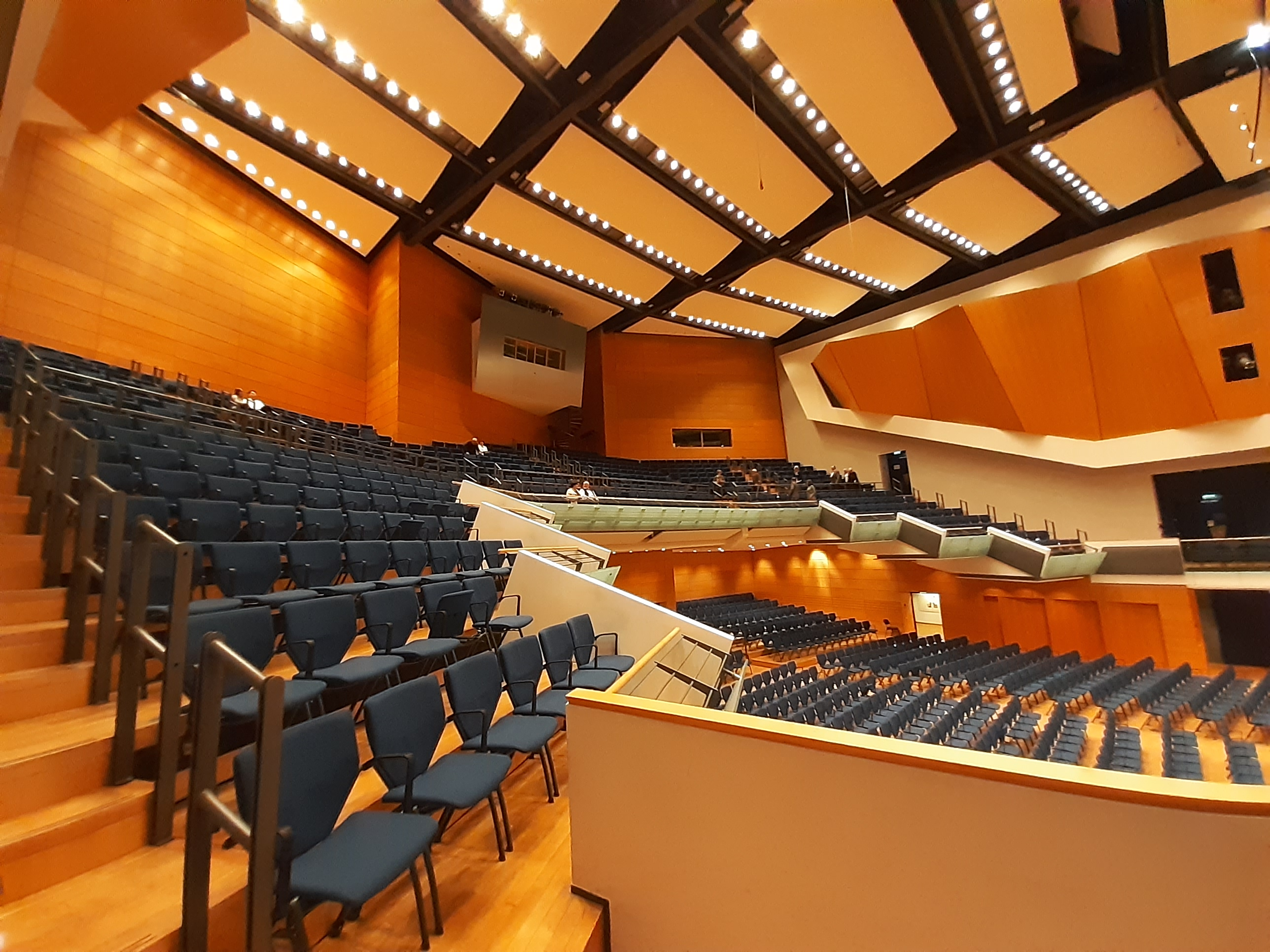
Large hall of the permanent venue Georg-Friedrich-Händel-Halle (2020)

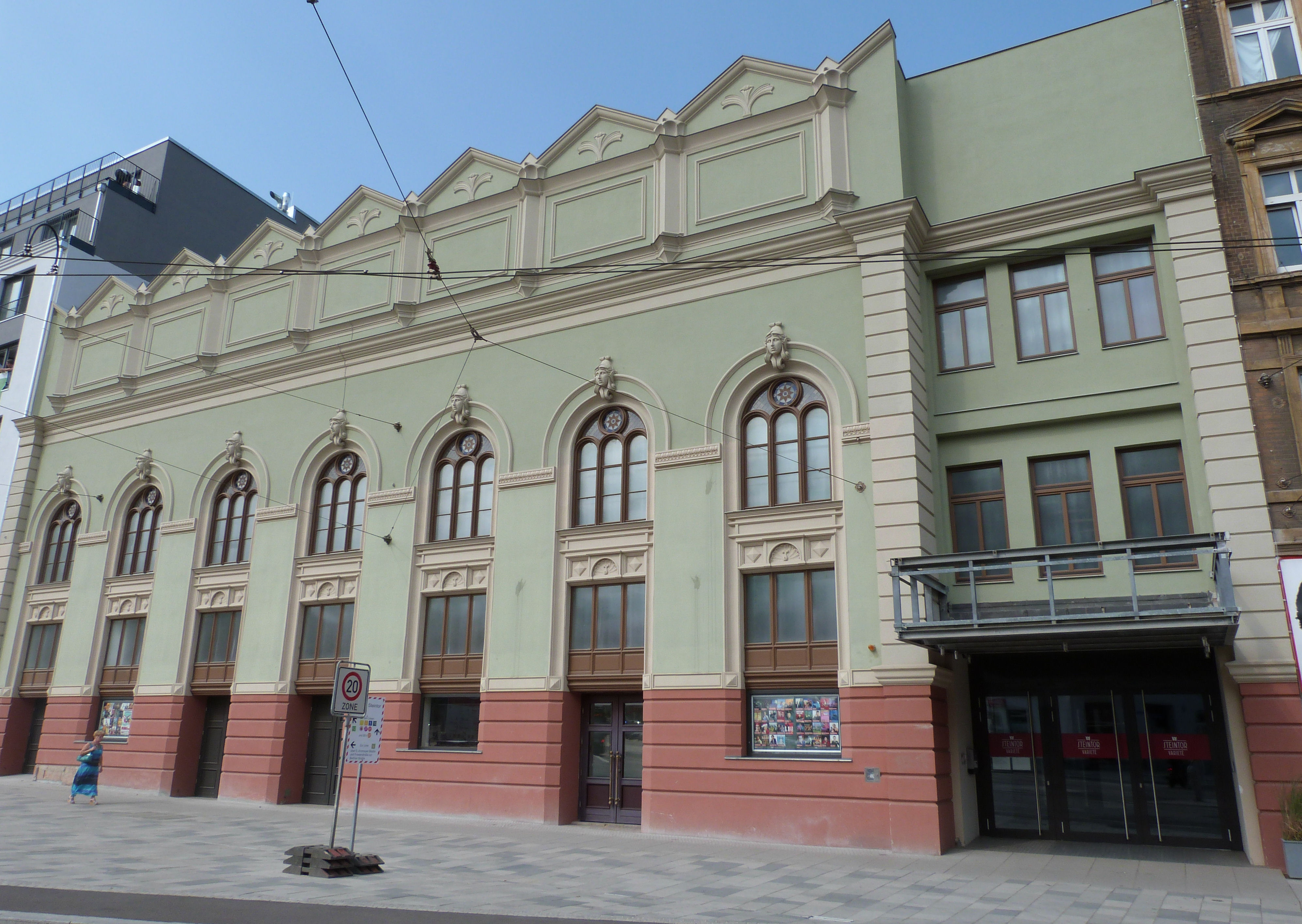
Ehemalige Hauptspielstätte Steintor-Varieté in Halle (2016)

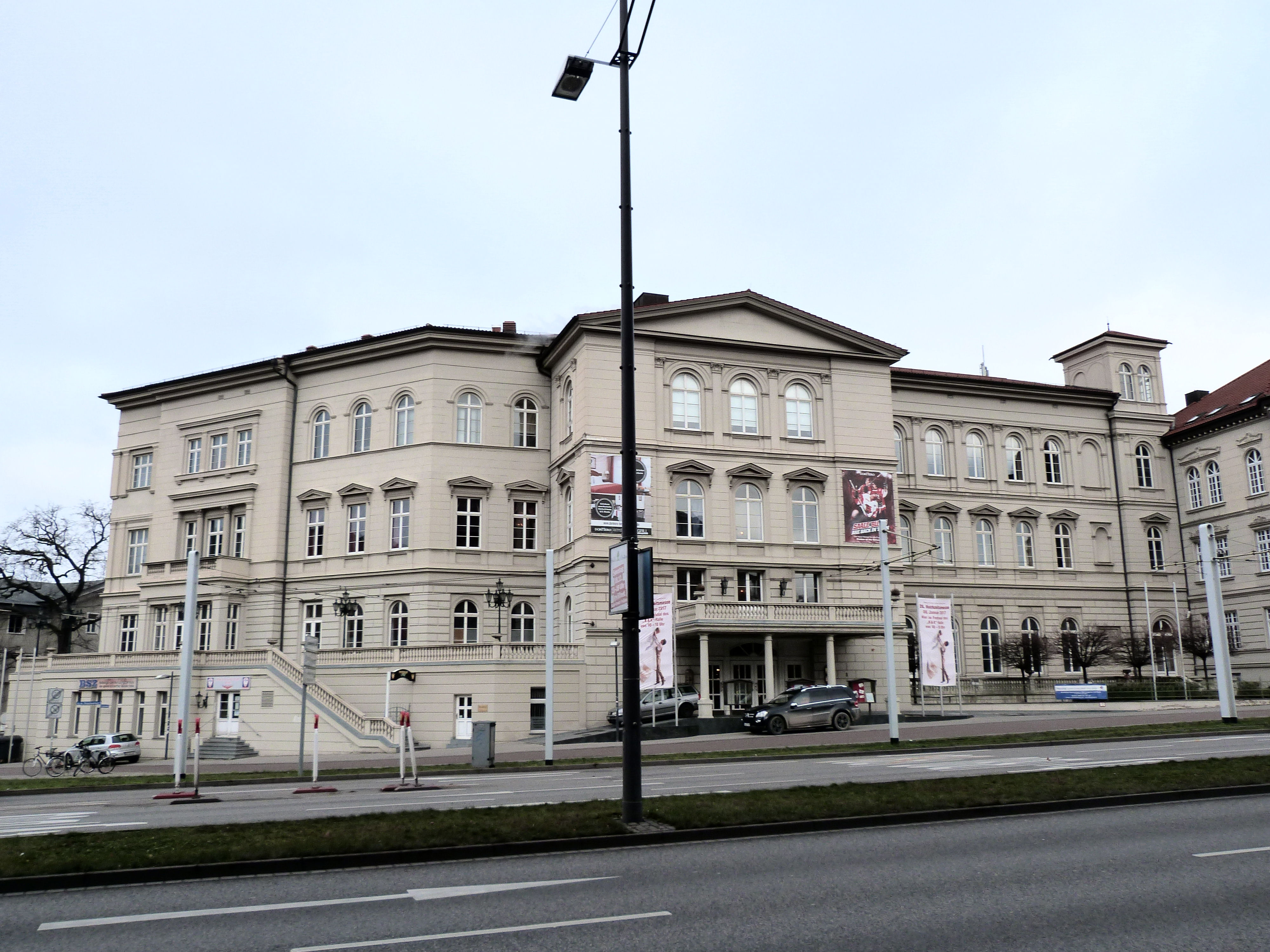
Congress and cultural centre, venue from 1995 to 1998 (2016)

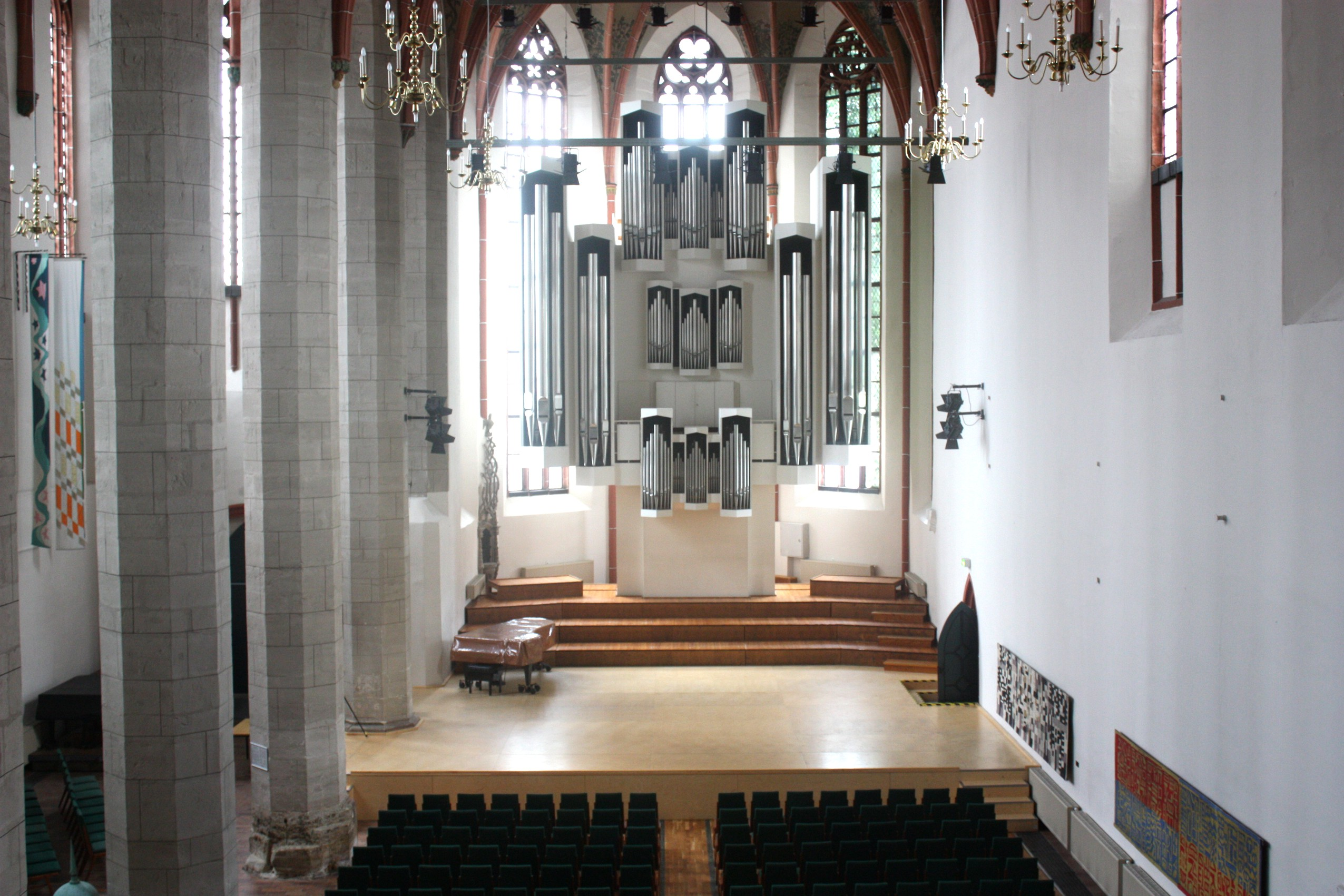
Former venue of the concert series "Konfrontation - Neue Musik im Gespräch": Konzerthalle St.-Ulrich-Kirche in Halle (2009)

The Philharmonische Staatsorchester Halle was a symphony orchestra in Halle that existed from 1946 to 2006, which functioned as a concert orchestra and was last predominantly supported by the Land of Saxony-Anhalt. As a result of the fusion with the Orchester des Opernhauses Halle, the orchestra was merged into the Staatskapelle Halle in 2006.

It was founded in 1946 by Arthur Bohnhardt as the "Hallisches Sinfonie-Orchester" and subsequently operated under various names. After the Robert Franz Singing Academy had joined it in 1953 and Hermann Abendroth had become honorary conductor, the Halle Symphony Orchestra was founded. Abendroth became honorary conductor, it became one of three State Symphony Orchestras in the GDR in 1954.

The orchestra experienced its heyday under the chief conductor Olaf Koch, who led the Hallesche Philharmonie to national recognition in the 1970s and 1980s. The orchestra premiered several Neue Musik works. From 1979, the affiliated avant-garde Ensemble Konfrontation set standards with its series of the same name. The Philharmonie was repeatedly awarded the Handel Prize of the Halle district.

After the Peaceful Revolution, the orchestra was elevated to Staatsorchester and led by Generalmusikdirektor Heribert Beissel. Well-known orchestra directors such as Bernhard Klee (1999/2000) and Wolf-Dieter Hauschild (2001–2004) now worked as conductors in Halle. From 1998 onwards, the permanent venue was the Georg-Friedrich-Händel-Halle.

== Names ==
- 1946–1949: Hallisches Sinfonie-Orchester
- 1949–1952: Landes-Volksorchester Sachsen-Anhalt
- 1952–1954: Landes-Sinfonieorchester Sachsen-Anhalt
- 1954–1972: Staatliches Sinfonieorchester Halle
- 1972–1991: Hallesche Philharmonie
- 1991–2006: Philharmonisches Staatsorchester Halle

== History ==
=== Arthur Bohnhardt (1946–1949) ===
After the reopening of the Halle Opera House, the Orchester des Opernhauses Halle was involved in the rehearsal of stage and orchestral works, so that the need for an entertainment orchestra arose. The second Kapellmeister at the Halle Opera House, Arthur Bohnhardt, now seized the opportunity and formed a string orchestra in April 1946, which gave its first concert on Good Friday in the St. Laurentius Church. Bohnhardt then performed with his orchestra under various names, reaching a wider audience for the first time in July 1946 in the courtyard of the Moritzburg as the Halliches Sinfonie-Orchester.

In September 1946, at a meeting of the Saxon Provincial Administration of the Arts and Literature Department and the municipal People's Education Office, the Good Friday for the orchestra was decided. The chief conductor put himself at the service of various political, social and cultural tasks. After the founding of the Staatliche Hochschule für Theater und Musik Halle it also functioned as the Hochschulorchester.

The first major symphony concert was held in January 1948 in the hall of the Volkspark. However, the "efforts for more recognition" were accompanied by "political pressure", as chronicler Susanne Baselt summarised it. At the end of the year, the Deutsche Volksbühne became the sponsor of the symphony concerts. After Bohnhardt's resignation in February 1949, Kapellmeister Heinz Hofmann initially took over the direction of the orchestra on a provisional basis. In particular, Alfred Hetschko, at that time music advisor in the Ministry of National Education of the state of Saxony-Anhalt, then initiated the change of name to "Landes-Volksorchester Sachsen-Anhalt" at the Landtag of Saxony-Anhalt.

=== Walter Schartner (1949–1950) ===
In September 1949, the former music director at the Stadttheater Halle, Walter Schartner, took over as principal conductor. Since all musicians had left the orchestra, the now vacant positions were partly filled by an additional staff from Dresden and the Loh-Orchester Sondershausen. Among others, Schartner put a seven-part Beethoven cycle on the programme. With Schartner's call to Weimar, Heinz Hofmann again stepped in as acting director.

Baselt made out a "direct political influence of party and state" on Schartner's successor. After Waldemar Steinhardt from Herzberg and Werner Gößling from Bielefeld, the search committee decided in favour of the latter.

=== Werner Gößling (1950–1956) ===
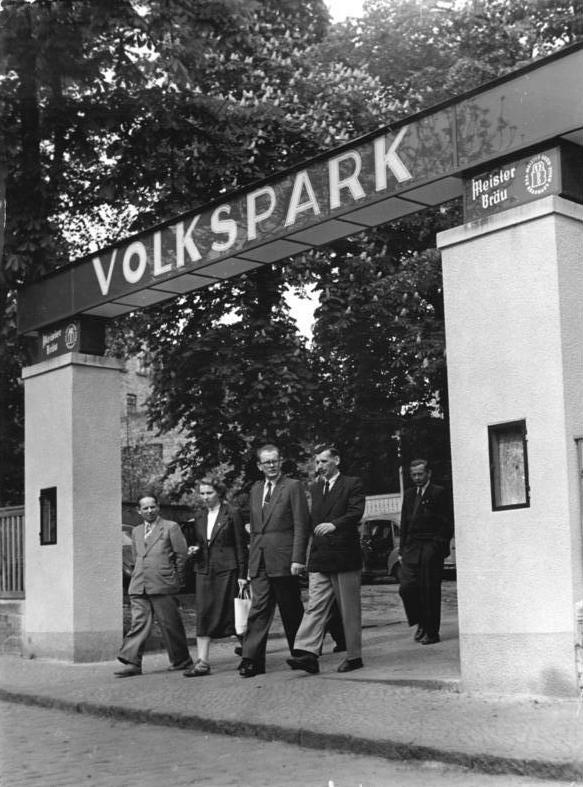
Entry of the Volkspark 1956

The symphony concerts took place in the "Klubhaus der Gewerkschaften". Werner Gößling, the new chief conductor, also wanted to expand the concerts to other cities in the state. Besides the classical-romantic repertoire, contemporary works were also to find their way into the programme. Gößling introduced the symphonic works of Anton Bruckner. In 1951, he founded the series "Ein Orchester stellt sich vorstellen" (An orchestra introduces itself).

After the founding of a third orchestra in Halle, which was supported by the trade union and tended to cultivate light entertainment music, the Landes-Volksorchester Sachsen-Anhalt was able to develop into the Kulturorchester in the 1950s. From 1950, the orchestra musicians fell under the "Wage and Salary Agreement for Theatre and Cultural Orchestras of the GDR". Guest conductors Hermann Abendroth, Helmut Seidelmann and Kurth Barth were recruited in the 1951/52 season. In addition, the orchestra among others was involved in Eastern European cultural exchange and in Handel care.

In 1952, the Volksorchester was renamed Sinfonieorchester. This was connected with the integration of the orchestra into the Staatshaushalt (State budget). Funds were made available for concerts in the Bezirk Leipzig, Bezirk Magdeburg and the Bezirk Halle. The programme now included works by modern and contemporary composers. Well-known artists such as Eva Barth, Werner Heutling and Hugo Steurer made guest appearances in Halle. From 1952, the orchestra also regularly took part at the Handel Festival Halle. First guest performances in West Germany were undertaken in 1953. After the dissolution of the East-German Länder, the orchestra was placed under the Rat des Bezirkes Halle. In the early 1950s, the orchestra was also positively reviewed by the Staatliche Kommission für Kunstangelegenheiten and the orchestra musicians were placed in Class I orchestras, plus performance bonuses.

Ernst Sachsenberg was hired as the new 1st Kapellmeister in 1953. In addition to its relationship with the Musikhochschule, the orchestra maintained intensive contact with the Evangelische Hochschule für Kirchenmusik Halle. The 1953/54 season also saw the affiliation of the Robert-Franz-Singakademie and the rise of the Landes-Sinfnieorchester to Staatliches Sinfonieorchester, so that there would now be three of its kind in the GDR: Thüringen Philharmonie Gotha-Eisenach, Mecklenburgische Staatskapelle in Schwerin and Halle. Furthermore, Hermann Abendroth was appointed honorary conductor after another guest conducting stint. Furthermore, they now played Beethoven's Symphony No. 9 regularly at the turn of the year and introduced the so-called Estradenkonzerte. In October 1953, the orchestra inaugurated the Kulturhaus Haus der Freundschaft in Schkopau.

In the 1954/55 season, the State Symphony Orchestra was given its own music dramaturge, the musicologist Herbert Koch. Famous musicians such as Nils-Eric Fougstedt and Vibeke Warlev were invited from Northern Europe. The next season featured equally important soloists Brünnhild Friedland, Hélène Boschi, Hugo Steurer, Ingeborg Robiller-Roloff, Dieter Zechlin, Helga Hussels, Egon Morbitzer, Vittorio Brero, Karl Suske and Mirko Dorner.

=== Horst Förster (1956–1964) ===
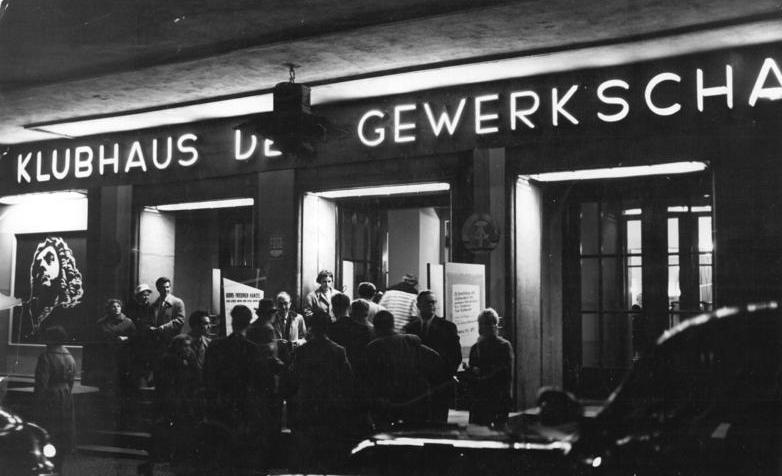
Trade union clubhouse during the Handel tribute in 1959

In 1956 the orchestra received a new chief conductor (Horst Förster) and a new 1st Kapellmeister (Karl-Ernst Sasse). Some musicians left the orchestra for the Gewandhausorchester and the Rundfunk-Sinfonieorchester Leipzig. The 1956/57 season produced the new concert series "Musica viva", which included performances by foreign composers such as Darius Milhaud, Kurt Atterberg, Dmitry Kabalevsky and Grażyna Bacewicz. However, the entitlement concerts at the Pädagogische Hochschule Halle-Köthen met with little audience response. Well-known guest conductors such as Otto Ebel von Sosen, Alois Klíma and Heinz Bongartz came to Halle for special concerts.

In 1956, the State Symphony Orchestra celebrated its tenth anniversary as part of the Hallische Musiktage, in which the orchestra had repeatedly participated since 1955. In addition, the orchestra took part in the concert series "Hausmusik im Handel House". In 1957, the State Symphony Orchestra toured through West Germany. In the late 1950s, performances by performers from Eastern European countries (Miloš Sádlo, Stanislav Knor, Josef Hrnčíř, Ilja Temkoff among others) also increased. In addition, the cycle "Masterpieces of the Nations" offered an insight into European musical creation.

In 1959, Harald Unger was engaged as 1st Kapellmeister. In 1961, the orchestra participated in the 1000-year celebration of the city of Halle. It also celebrated its fifteenth anniversary. In 1962, the orchestra made a guest appearance in Czechoslovakia. A friendship treaty was signed with the symphony orchestra in Karlovy Vary. After Förster's departure, Gerhart Wiesenhütter and Karl-Ernst Sasse were considered promising candidates to succeed him.

=== Karl-Ernst Sasse (1964–1967) ===
The decision was finally made in favour of Förster's former deputy, Karl-Ernst Sasse. However, he was not very successful in his programme planning among others the positively received chamber music rights with Rudi Zücker and Horst Uhlig were not continued. Furthermore, Sasse did not maintain sufficient contact with the Robert Franz Singing Academy. The orchestra also did not participate in the Handel Festival, Halle from 1965 to 1967. Although the orchestra board wanted to make Unger music director, his contract was not renewed. In 1967, he was succeeded by Joachim Seidel as 1st Kapellmeister.

=== Olaf Koch (1967–1990) ===
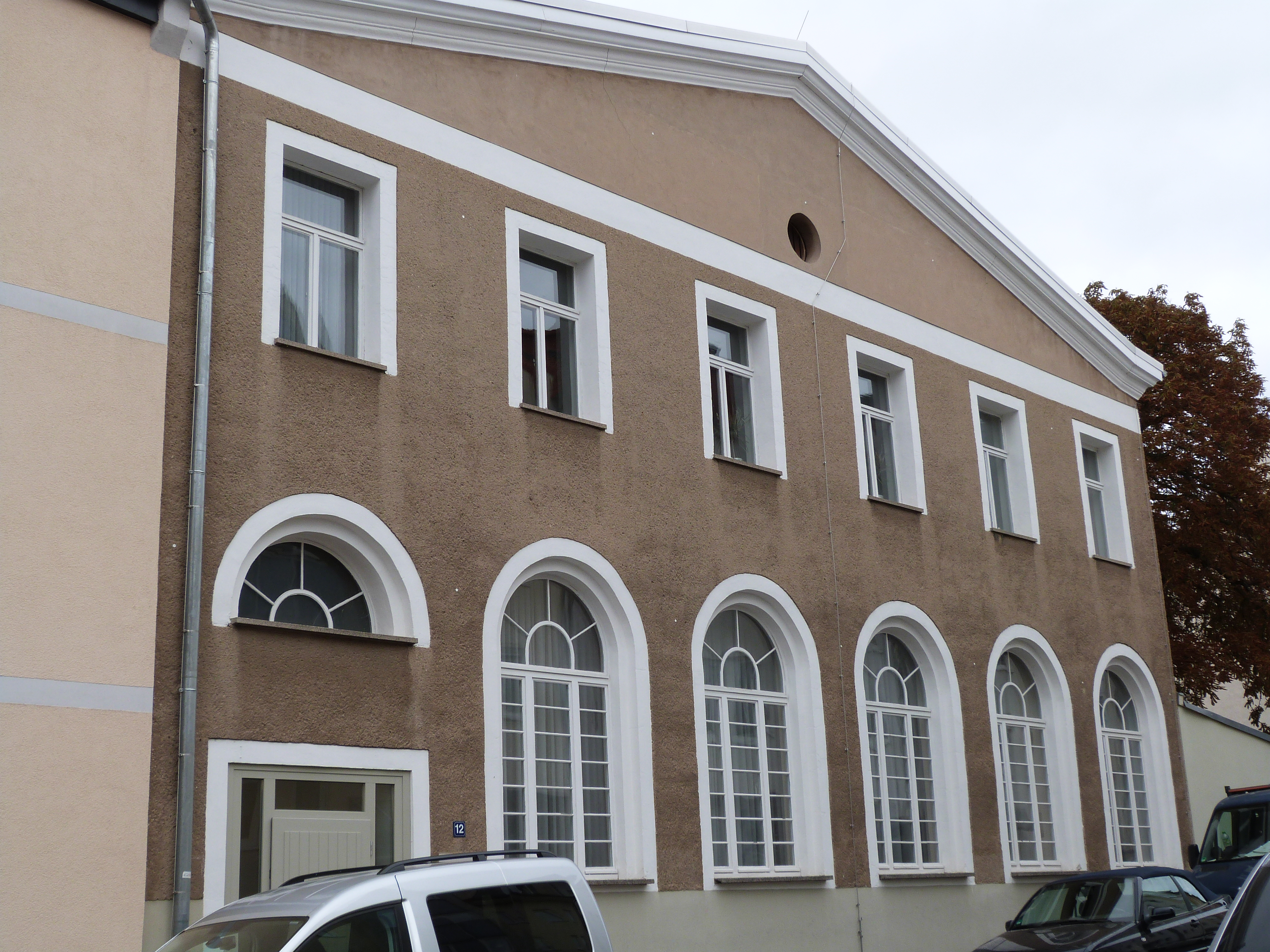
Reconstructed rehearsal house of the Hallische Philharmonie in the Großen Gosenstraße 12 (2016)

Olaf Koch replaced Sasse as chief conductor in 1967. At the Singakademie, Hartmut Haenchen had already taken over the position of choir director a year earlier. In 1969, Karl-Heinz Zettl became 1st Kapellmeister and deputy chief conductor. With this new leadership team, it was now possible to attract audiences to the concert halls again. To this end, entitlement concerts were expanded and participation in the Handel Festival resumed. Koch placed an emphasis on Neue Musik from the GDR and the Soviet Union, in addition to musical modernism. He performed works that "did not quite fit into the demands of "Socialist Realism". Furthermore, works by Western composers were also performed. From 1969 onwards, public discussions with Werktätiger about the concert plans. For example, an expansion took place at the entitlement concerts in the clubhouse "Marx-Engels in Zeitz". In 1970, so-called "Workers' Youth Concerts" were established, which after the fall of communism operated as "Youth Symphony Concerts". But also student concerts were cultivated.

In 1972, the State Symphony Orchestra, the Robert Franz Singing Academy and the Stadtsingechor merged to form the Halle Philharmonic Orchestra. In 1979, Hans Jürgen Wenzel founded the concert series Konfrontation - Neue Musik im Gespräch, which had its home in the concert hall St. Moritz, Halle, partly in the Kulturinsel Halle had its home.

At the end of 1989, Olaf Koch was voted out by the orchestra musicians in the Pobenhaus at Große Gosenstraße 12. In 1990, he gave his last concert at the Handel Festival. The cultural editor Gisela Heine wrote in the Liberal-Demokratische Zeitung Halle at the time: "In Olaf Koch I always saw the great conductor who, in the course of 23 years, developed the Halle Philharmonic into a world-class orchestra. [...] I knew from musicians and from my own experience that Olaf Koch could be quite a creep. [...] What went on in the background hardly reached the public."

=== Heribert Beissel (1990–1999) ===
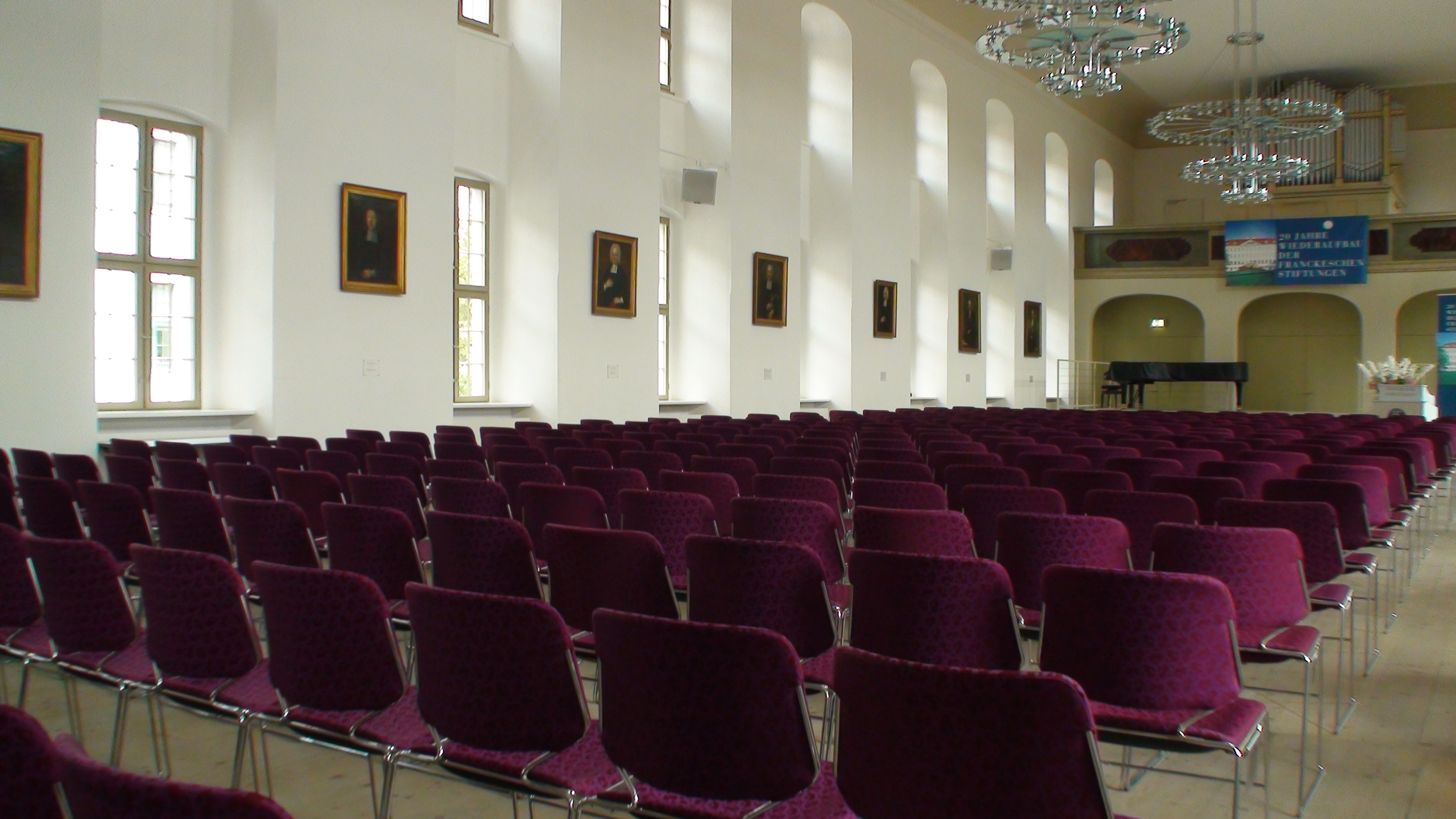
Former venue of the Baroque matinées: Freylinghausen-Saal of the Francke Foundations (2010)

Afterwards, the conductor Heribert Beissel, who was particularly devoted to Viennese classical music and came from Hamburg, was elected to his post. In 1991, he was appointed general music director, and the Halle Philharmonic was also transformed into a Staatsorchester. In the same year, the Gesellschaft der Freunde der Halleschen Philharmonie e.V. was founded, assisted by a Board of directors under Hans-Dietrich Genscher's authority.

Beissel was assisted by Oliver Pohl and Marc Piollet from 1993 to 1997 as first bandmasters. The symphony concerts of the Philharmonic State Orchestra were initially held in the Steintor-Varieté until the restoration was finished. Furthermore, the opera house and the Ulrichskirche concert hall were used. From 1995 to 1998, the hall of the Congress and Cultural Centre served as a temporary venue. In 1998, Beissel inaugurated the Great Hall of the Georg-Friedrich-Händel-Halle in the Nördliche Innenstadt, the orchestra's first permanent venue. In addition, concert series were held in the auditorium of the Martin Luther University of Halle-Wittenberg ("Viennese Classical Music"), at the Neues Theater ("Baroque Music") and at the Galerie Moritzburg (New Music with the Ensemble Konfrontation). Furthermore, there was a popular symphonic series with "Bella Musica". For special and choral concerts, the Halle Cathedral and the St. Moritz, Halle were available. Last but not least, the Handel House was used for chamber music and the Freylinghausen-Saal for baroque matinées, as well as the Domplatz and the courtyard of the Handel House for open-air concerts. During Beissel's tenure as general music director, the orchestra gave guest performances in Argentina, Spain and Austria, among others.

After Beissel's tenure ended in 1999/2000, Bernhard Klee took over a permanent guest conducting position in Halle.

=== Wolf-Dieter Hauschild (2001–2004) ===
From 2001 to 2004, Wolf-Dieter Hauschild was chief conductor of the Halle Philharmonic State Orchestra. He planned a combined programme of modern and classical music including an integrated jazz concert and a Concert performance. Hauschild, however, then left the orchestra prematurely because of the threatened merger with the Orchester des Opernhauses Halle.

=== Heribert Esser (2004–2005) ===
The last chief conductor from 2004 was Heribert Esser, who transferred the orchestra to the new concert and theatre orchestra, Staatskapelle Halle.

== Chief conductors ==
- 1946–1949: Arthur Bohnhardt
- 1949: Heinz Hofmann – provisional
- 1949–1950: Walter Schartner
- 1950: Heinz Hofmann – provisional
- 1950–1956: Werner Gößling
- 1956–1964: Horst Förster
- 1964–1967: Karl-Ernst Sasse
- 1967–1990: Olaf Koch
- 1990–1999: Heribert Beissel
- 1999–2000: Bernhard Klee – permanent guest conductor
- 2001–2004: Wolf-Dieter Hauschild
- 2004–2006: Heribert Esser – permanent guest conductor from the 2005/06 season onwards
- Hermann Abendroth was appointed honorary conductor in 1953.

== World premieres (selection) ==
- Hellmut Riethmüller: 2. Sinfonie (1954).
- Gerhard Wohlgemuth: 1. Sinfonie (1955).
- Walter Draeger: Violinkonzert (1956).
- Gerhard Wohlgemuth: Sinfonietta (1957).
- Hans Stieber: Violinkonzert (1957).
- Hans Stieber: Barlach-Kantate Fries der Lauschenden (1957).
- Percy M. Young: Festmusik Der rote Turm (1961).
- Gerhard Wohlgemuth: Oratorium Jahre der Wandlung (1961).
- Lothar Voigtländer: Sinfonischer Satz (1969)
- Gerhard Tittel: Chorsinfonie Lied vom Menschen (1969)
- Heinz Röttger: Konzert für Violine und Orchester (1969).
- Hans Jürgen Wenzel: Trassensinfonie (1970).
- Gerhard Wohlgemuth Sinfonische Musik für großes Orchester (1971).
- Paul Kurzbach: Kantate Porträt eines Arbeiters (1971)
- Alan Bush: Afrika Sinfonischer Satz für Klavier und Orchester (1972)
- Fritz Geißler: Sinfonie Nr. 8 (1974).
- Karl Ottomar Treibmann: Capriccio 71 für Orchester (1974).
- Günter Kochan: Konzert für Viola und Orchester (1975).
- Wolfgang Hohensee: Oratorium „Die Antwort“ (1975)
- Rudolf Herold: Sinfonisches Poem An der Wolga (1975).
- Erhard Ragwitz: Sinfonia intrada (1976)
- Kirill Wolkow: Konzert für großes Orchester (1976).
- Wolfgang Stendel: Inventionen for Orchestra (1976)
- Hans J. Wenzel: Bauhaus – Musik für Orchester (1978).
- Valery Strukow: Konzert für Klavier und Orchester (1979).
- Bert Poulheim: Fagottkonzert (1979).
- Ruth Zechlin: Briefe für Orchester (1980).
- Hans J. Wenzel: Konzert für Orgel und Orchester (1980).
- Günter Kochan: Passacaglia und Hymne für großes Orchester (1980).
- Reinhard Kalleske: Orchestermusik Canto ailo humano (1980).
- Wolfgang Stendel: Konzert für Violoncello und Orchester (1981).
- Hans Wolfgang Sachse: Festliche Intrade für großes Orchester (1981).
- Wolfgang Hohensee: Variationen über die Messias-Arie Das Volk, das da wandelt im Dunkel (1981).
- Bert Poulheim: 3rd Sinfonie (1981).
- Gerhard Rosenfeld: Konzert für Orchester (1982).
- Thomas Reuter: Mundana für großes Orchester (1982).
- Dietrich Boekle: Concerto für großes Orchester (1982).
- Bert Poulheim: Orchestermusik Aufforderung (1984).
- Reiner Bredemeyer: Orchesterstücke II (1985).
- Hans J. Wenzel: Sinfonie für großes Orchester Trauer und Feuer III (1985).
- Thomas Müller: Spuren für großes Orchester (1986).
- Frank Petzold: Stieber-Reflexionen für Orchester (1986).
- Reiner Bredemeyer: III. Sonatine für Orchester (1988).
- Siegfried Geißler: 8. Sinfonie mit Bariton (1988).
- Stojan Stojantschew: Orchestermusik in vier Sätzen (1988).
- Leila Ismagilowa: Taktasch-Sinfonie für Sopran und Orchester (1988).
- Kurt Schwaen: Klavierkonzert Nr. 2 „Vietnamesisches Konzert“ (1989).
- Dietrich Boekle: Concerto für großes Orchester (Neufassung) (1989).
- Gerhard Stäbler: "energy-light-dream" für Sopransolo, Orchester, Fern-Ensemble mit Bariton und Tonband (2000).
- Leif Segerstam: Sinfonie Nr. 54 Dreaming again … because … (2003).
- Gergely Vajda: Blue box für Orchester (2003)
- Jean-Christophe Marti: H aspiré (2003).
- Jens Marggraf: Sidera medicea für Orchester (2005).

== Chamber music ensembles ==
- Camerata da camera Halle – Baroque ensemble, founded by Harald Unger, which appeared publicly from 1962 to 1966 among others in the Moritzburg
- In 1973, Olaf Koch founded a chamber orchestra, the direction of which was taken over by Karl-Heinz Zettl in 1984, focusing on 18th-century music, especially Georg Friedrich Handel; Concert tours also took the ensemble to Western foreign countries
- In addition, there was a string quartet, a wind quintet and a wind chamber music association.
- Hans Jürgen Wenzel founded the "Ensemble Konfrontation", specialising in Neue Musik, in 1979, which became involved in the Handel Festival as well as the Hallische Musiktage from 1983; from 1989 it was continued by Thomas Müller.

== Awards ==
- 1960: Handel Prize.
- 1969: Bester der 1. Etappe des Orchesterwettbewerbs der DDR.
- 1976: Handel Prize of the Halle district.
- 1989: Interpretenpreis der MaerzMusik (with the Ensemble Konfrontation).
