= Werner Gößling =

German conductor

Werner Gustav Rudolf Gößling (17 January 1898 – 8 September 1992) was a German conductor, choir director, composer and university lecturer. He was the chief conductor of the Philharmonisches Staatsorchester Halle and the Robert Franz Singakademie in Halle. In 1951, he was appointed general music director. From 1956 to 1958, he built up the first Chinese symphony orchestra in the European style.

== Life ==
Gößling was as the son of Eduard Gößling and his wife Elisabeth Schrader in Westphalia. In Bielefeld, he attended the humanistic grammar school. During the First World War, he served as a naval cadet in the Imperial Navy.

Gößling enrolled at the Ludwig-Maximilians-Universität München (LMU Munich) to study philosophy in 1919. Later, he probably studied art history, philosophy and German literature in Heidelberg. In 1920, he went to Berlin, where he started to study music. At the Humboldt University of Berlin, he attended lectures by the musicologists Johannes Wolf and Max Friedlaender. At the same time, he studied at the Stern Conservatory, where he was trained as Kapellmeister by Karl Schröder II, James Kwast and Wilhelm Klatte. Klatte introduced him to the music of Johann Sebastian Bach. Furthermore, Alexander von Fielitz, Friedrich Koch and Nikolaus Rothmühl were among his teachers. In addition, Siegfried Ochs trained him as a choir director.

In 1922/23, Gößling became a solo répétiteur at the Mecklenburgisches Staatstheater Schwerin. From 1923 to 1925, he worked as Kapellmeister and choral conductor at the Theater am Kohlenmarkt in the Free City of Danzig. In 1926, he moved to the Nationaltheater Mannheim, where he worked mainly as a choir conductor among others the Lehrergesangsverein Mannheim-Ludwigshafen was active. In Mannheim, he learned a lot from the guest conductors Wilhelm Furtwängler, Richard Strauss and Hans Pfitzner.

In 1929, Hermann Abendroth brought him to Cologne. He was repertoire bandmaster and 1st choir director at the Opera there. At the Gürzenich Orchestra Cologne, he appeared in the seasons 1929/30 and 1930/31 under general music director Eugen Szenkar as theatre bandmaster. In addition, he became director of the opera school at the Hochschule für Musik und Tanz Köln, which he was instrumental in designing.

Already on 1 February 1932 and thus before the seizure of power in 1933, Gößling joined the NSDAP (membership number 894.495). At the instigation of the party he was appointed Music Director of the City of Bielefeld on 1 July 1933. So after Gößling had taken up the position of the terminated Max Cahnbley, Heinrich Kaminski took up his position in September 1933 as a result of a dispute with Gößling as director of the symphony concerts and resigned in June 1934 as director of the Musikverein. Plays by Jewish and socialist artists were banned from the repertoire. Instead, the Theater Bielefeld now favoured works by Richard Wagner. In Detmold, he conducted the orchestra at the Richard-Wagner-Festwochen, where partly Heinz Tietjen took over the direction. Besides Wagner, he conducted Mozart, Beethoven, Brahms and Bruckner in those years. In addition, he was active as a conductor for the Deutschlandsender and the Hamburg radio station. In the 1930s, Gößling competed in Bielefeld with Hans Hoffmann, who, as choirmaster of the "Bielefelder Musikverein", conducted half of the symphony concerts of the Bielefelder Philharmoniker. Disputes about official authority and orchestra rehearsals are documented from 1938. On 3 June 1940, Gößling joined the Wehrmacht (Kriegsmarine), whereupon Hoffmann took over his office, at first provisionally and from April 1943 completely.

After his captivity as a prisoner of war, from 1945 to 1948 he was the musical director at the Schleswig-Holsteinisches Landestheater und Sinfonieorchester. In the course of a rehearsal conducting, he was appointed in 1950 as successor to Walter Schartner Chief conductor of the Landes-Volksorchester Sachsen-Anhalt, which he led until 1956 as Landes-Sinfonieorchester (1952) and Philharmonisches Staatsorchester Halle (1954). At the end of 1953, the "Robert-Franz-Singakademie" was incorporated. Accordingly, Gößling also appeared with oratorio performances, so he conducted the final concert of the Handel Festival, Halle in 1952. The interpretations of the Handel oratorios Samson (1953) and Joshua (1954), however, lagged behind the opera performances of Horst-Tanu Margraf despite a solid cast. In 1953/54, Gößling performed Beethoven's Symphony No. 9. Because of his achievements, he was appointed general music director by the State Commission for Art Affairs in 1951. He also became head of the Kapellmeister training at the Staatliche Hochschule für Theater und Musik Halle, where he was appointed professor in 1952. Among the graduates of his conducting class were Johannes Schröder, Günther Lossau and Joachim Widlak. Relatively early, Gößling was active in the Halle-Magdeburg district association of the Verband der Komponisten und Musikwissenschaftler der DDR. However, only a few contemporary works by GDR composers were included in the critically reviewed programme planning of his orchestra..

In 1956, Gößling received an invitation to Beijing, where he was to build up a first Chinese Symphony orchestra based on the European model, the present China National Symphony Orchestra. For this purpose, he trained several Chinese conductors. On the one hand, his "fatherly friend" Abendroth had arranged for him to go to China, but on the other hand, he was probably simply being praised by the city council.

Since Abendroth died in 1956, an originally intended call to Weimar was not possible. Instead, Gößling went to the Federal Republic of Germany, where he was the principal conductor of the Philharmonic Orchestra Northwest in Wilhelmshaven from 1958 until his retirement in 1962. From 1958 to 1969, he was also conductor of the "Orchester der Musikfreunde Bremen". With this amateur orchestra, he premiered various works by Bremen composers. From 1970 to 1973, he was 1st chairman of the Bremen regional association of the Deutscher Tonkünstlerverband as successor to Gerd Reinfeldt. He also directed the state competition of the Jugend musiziert in Bremen until 1974.

Gößling died in Bremen at the age of 94.

== Family and estate ==
Gößling was married to Eva von Carlowitz in his first marriage. After her death in 1925, he married Thekla Hoffmann, née Wille. He was a cousin of the violinist Georg Kulenkampff.

His estate is located in the university library of LMU Munich. Further correspondence has been preserved, among others in the Saxon State and University Library Dresden, Leipzig University Library and the public library Bielefeld.

== Compositions ==
- Schauspielmusik für kleines Orchester zur Komödie Volpone by Ben Jonson (premiere Mannheim 1927)
- Musik für mittleres Orchester zur Komödie Love's Labour's Lost by Shakespeare, (premiere Mannheim 1927)
- Musik für mittleres Orchester zum Ideendrama Don Juan und Faust by Christian Dietrich Grabbe (premiere Mannheim 1928)
- Operette Die Ministerin with a libretto by Otto Rudolf Frank (premiere Mannheim 1928)

Cultural offices
Preceded by Heinz Hofmann	Music Director, Staatsorchester Halle; 1950–1956	Succeeded by Horst Förster
