= Heino Kaski =

Finnish composer (1885–1957)

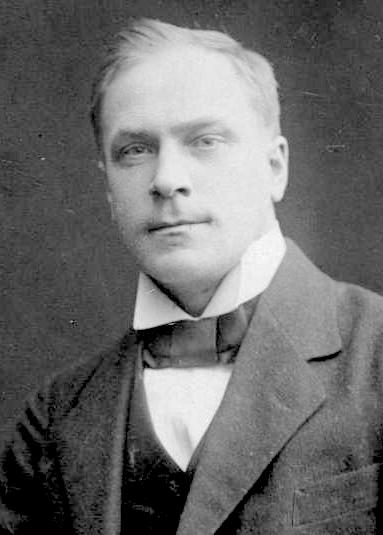
The composer (c. 1910s)

Heino Wilhelm Daniel Kaski (21 June 1885 – 19 September 1957) was a Finnish composer, teacher and pianist.

== Life ==
Kaski was born in Pielisjärvi into a cantor's family. His father taught him the violin, and was generally supportive: when Kaski dropped out of secondary school to study music full-time in Helsinki, he did not object. Kaski first studied at the Helsinki Cantor-Organist school, then entered the Philharmonic's Orchestra School. There, he continued studying the violin, but was also tutored in theory (by Ilmari Krohn) and composition (by Erkki Melartin).

In 1911, on Jean Sibelius's recommendation, Kaski received a grant that enabled him to study for four years in Berlin, under Paul Juon. In 1914 he returned to Finland; one of his larger works, Symphony in B minor, was composed in 1914–1919 under partial guidance from Selim Palmgren. The symphony was performed on October 2, 1919. The same year, Kaski went to Europe again, to study under Otto Taubmann in Berlin, and then traveled and studied in Italy and France. He finally returned to Finland in 1924, and since then worked as music teacher in various schools. He gave nine composition concerts and in 1950 was awarded the Pro Finlandia medal.

Kaski died in Helsinki on 19 September 1957 at the age of 72. His death was overshadowed by that of Jean Sibelius, who died one day later at the age of 91. Kaski is buried in the Hietaniemi Cemetery in Helsinki.

Kaski is best known for his piano miniatures (which number over one hundred), in which he displays a natural gift for melody, and for his songs (similarly more than one hundred of them), although he also authored numerous chamber works, four orchestral suites, and many other pieces.

== Selected works ==
- Impromptu, for piano, op. 5/2
- Prelude in G-flat major, op. 7
- Symphony in B minor, op. 16 (1919)
- Reverie, for piano, op. 19/1
- Die Quellenymphe, for piano, op. 19/2
- Syysaamu (An Autumn Morning), for piano, op. 21/2
- Kevätaamu Caprilla (A Spring Morning at Capri), for piano, op. 25/3
- Violin Sonata (1920)
- Cello Sonata (1923)
- Yö meren rannalla (Night by the Sea), for piano, op. 34/1
- Piano Pieces op. 48:
- Pankakoski (Prelude in B minor), for piano, op. 48/1
- Vanha kellotapuli, for piano, op. 48/2
- Walamo, for piano, op. 48/3
- Flute Sonata in B major, op. 51 (1937)
- Four orchestral suites, symphonic poem, chamber works, about a hundred songs and a similar amount of solo piano music.
