= Horst Förster (conductor, 1920) =

German conductor and violinist

Horst Förster (13 March 1920 – 30 June 1986) was a German conductor, choirmaster, violinist and university teacher. In 1952, he was appointed the youngest general music director of the GDR in the Landestheater Eisenach. Afterwards, he was chief conductor of the Philharmonisches Staatsorchester Halle and the Singakademie Halle (1956–1964) as well as the Dresden Philharmonic (1964–1966), and of Belgrade Philharmonic Orchestra from 1985 to 1986.

== Early life and education ==
Förster was born in 1920 in Dresden, the son of Willibald Förster and his wife Martha Ziesche. From 1936 to 1940, he underwent his musical training at the orchestral school of the Staatskapelle Dresden. His teachers included among others Jan Dahmen (violin), Lothar Köhnke (piano, theory and composition), Kurt Striegler (conducting) and Alfred Stier (choral conducting). For a time he was a member of the Dresden Philharmonic under Paul van Kempen.

== Career ==
After the Second World War, he was the second violinist of the same orchestra until 1950. In 1947, he founded a chamber orchestra there, which he conducted for three years.

He then went to the Landestheater Eisenach in Thuringia. On 1 January 1951, he succeeded Peter Schmitz Director of the Stadtorchester Eisenach. This was then subordinated to the theatre as a theatre and concert orchestra under the name Landeskapelle Eisenach. In 1952, he was appointed as the youngest general music director of the GDR at the time.

After initially being a guest conductor, he succeeded Werner Gößling as chief conductor of the Philharmonisches Staatsorchester Halle and the Singakademie Halle from 1956 to 1964. He repeatedly took part in the Handel Festival, Halle. According to Gilbert Stöck, he struck "a rather independent path in the programme conception" in the Saale city, which met with criticism in the East-German Ministry of Culture. In coordination with the Halle-Magdeburg Association of Composers and Musicologists of the GDR ('VDK'), he founded the contemporary music series "Musica Viva" in the 1956/57 season, in which works by living composers from the region were to be performed. Thus, as late as 1956, on the occasion of the Hallische Musiktage, which he had helped to initiate, Walter Draeger's Violin Concerto.

Förster's refusal to join the VDK, however, resulted in a public controversy with Walther Siegmund-Schultze. Afterwards, "[Förster] adapted to certain political guidelines", aiming at "ensuring quality in performances of contemporary music" without having sustainably promoted composers of the region, Stöck says. In 1962, Förster premiered the Piano Concerto by Ernst Hermann Meyer with the Dresden Philharmonic Orchestra and Dieter Zechlin as soloist. He also appeared with a Mozart-Beethoven-Schumann cycle as guest conductor with the Konzerthausorchester Berlin. Repeatedly he was invited abroad, for example in 1963 he gave guest performances with the Riga Radio Symphony Orchestra and the Saint Petersburg Philharmonic in the Soviet Union. A year later he conducted the National Philharmonic in Warsaw.

From September 1964 to 1966, he was principal conductor of the Dresden Philharmonic Orchestra. He opened the 1964–1965 season with a concert with the US violinist Ruggiero Ricci. After Förster had been criticised by the state in Halle for his too Western repertoire, he tried to serve more composers from Eastern Europe in Dresden. Moreover, he continued the contemporary music cultivation of his predecessor Heinz Bongartz. Thus he performed the Rhapsody for Orchestra by Johannes Paul Thilman, the concerto for piano (with Annerose Schmidt) and the Symphonic Concerto by Gerhard Rosenfeld as well as the cantatas Eros by Fidelio F. Finke and Schir Haschirim by Rudolf Wagner-Régeny on the premiere.

In 1957, he received a teaching assignment and in 1961 a professorship at the Hochschule für Musik "Hanns Eisler". Until his Dresden appointment, he led a conducting class there. After his illness, he was again active as a university teacher. Among his students were Peter Aderhold, Hans-Dieter Baum, Christian Ehwald, Helmut Gleim, Hartmut Haenchen, Christian Kluttig, Volker Rohde and Jörg-Peter Weigle. In Eisenach, he promoted the young Kapellmeister Rolf Reuter.

Also during his years of office in Dresden it took him abroad as a guest conductor, as in 1965 to Chile. Together with Bongartz, he undertook an extended orchestral concert tour to West Germany in the same year. More and more, however, Förster's strength dwindled due to illness. Until 1965 he was still supported by the second conductor Gerhard Rolf Baue, then by the guest conductors György Lehel, Klaus Tennstedt and Heinz Rögner as well as Dieter Härtwig. Förster's successor in leading the Dresden Philharmonic was Kurt Masur.

Förster died in Dresden at the age of 66.

== Personal life ==
From 1943 he was married to Liesbeth Förster, née Schuriczek.

== Awards ==
- 1962: Handel Prize of the district of Halle (for the State Symphony Orchestra). Christoph Rink: Chronologie des Händelpreises. In Mitteilungen des Freundes- und Förderkreises des Händel-Hauses zu Halle e.V. 1/2012, pp. 20–25, here p. 23.
- 1963: Patriotic Order of Merit in Bronze ("In recognition of outstanding services in the cultural field").

Cultural offices
Preceded by Werner Gößling	Music Director, Staatsorchester Halle; 1956–1964	Succeeded by Karl-Ernst Sasse
