= Jeanette Chéro =

German woman singer (1927–2023)

Jeanette Chéro (née Christiane Roscher, 4 April 1927 – 22 January 2023) was a German artist and representative of the literary chanson in Germany.

== Life and career ==
Born in Dresden on 4 April 1927, Chéro grew up with classical music and started composing at the age of nine. Her song cycles were sung under her maiden name by famous performers (among others Kammersänger Kurt Böhme, Kammersänger Gottlob Frick, Professor Walter Hauck, Theo Adam, Werner Faulhaber). In her hometown Dresden she played in numerous concerts and live radio broadcasts together with the outstanding violinist Anneliese Möhner. Chéro studied piano, composition and singing in Dresden and later took acting and ballet lessons in Berlin. She married the general music director Walter Schartner in 1957.

In Berlin, she worked for several years at the Berliner Rundfunk, for which she wrote many choral arrangements. She performed as a pianist and accompanist for her own song cycles at various radio stations until she discovered her love for song and later for literary chanson. She performs her chansons herself on the grand piano in full-length concerts. She wrote numerous commissioned compositions for the WDR and German re-enactments of English, French and Italian titles for the Edition Akkord. Her classical song cycles have been published several times in orchestral version in Kemerovo (Russia) for performance.

Evening concerts with exclusively own works took place in the festival weeks in Bad Kreuznach, in the Cologne Senftöpfchen (1980), in the community centre "Bergischer Löwe" in Bergisch Gladbach (1981, 1988, 2000 with Jakob Poiesz), in the Brühl Galerie am Schloß (1982), in the Hamburger Podium (1982), in the Schloss Eulenbroich in Rösrath (1984, 1995), at the Oberstdorf Cultural Days (1989, 1990), at the international Weilburger Schlosskonzerten (1994), in Koblenz and in St. Wendel (Saarland), as well as solo performances with her own chansons in Berlin, Stuttgart, Hamburg, Hilden and Bad Kreuznach. In addition, there were TV appearances with his own works, for example at Peter Horton's "Café in Takt" and in the programme "Auf dem Kriegspfad - Sinn und Unsinn der Atomrüstung", a production of the WDR. In several episodes of the series "Historisches Kabarett 1919-1945" (also a WDR production,) she could be seen and heard, among others with interpretations of chansons by Walter Mehring.

At the Rheinische Musikschule (Conservatory of the City of Cologne) she was a piano teacher and for many years head of a chanson class. Her students included the conductor and composer Johannes Kalitzke and the pianists of the Bläck Fööss Rolf Lammers (later L.S.E.) and Dieter "Joko" Jaenisch.

Chéro was a leading representative of the literary chanson, which is rare in Germany. She died on 22 January 2023, at the age of 95.

== Recordings ==
- Jeanette Chéro: Deutsche Chansons, Ekke-Musik, 1981
- Music Is All For Me - Béla Mavrák singt Songs von Jeanette Chéro, Musikverlag Termidor, 2015
