= Otto Taubmann =

German composer and conductor

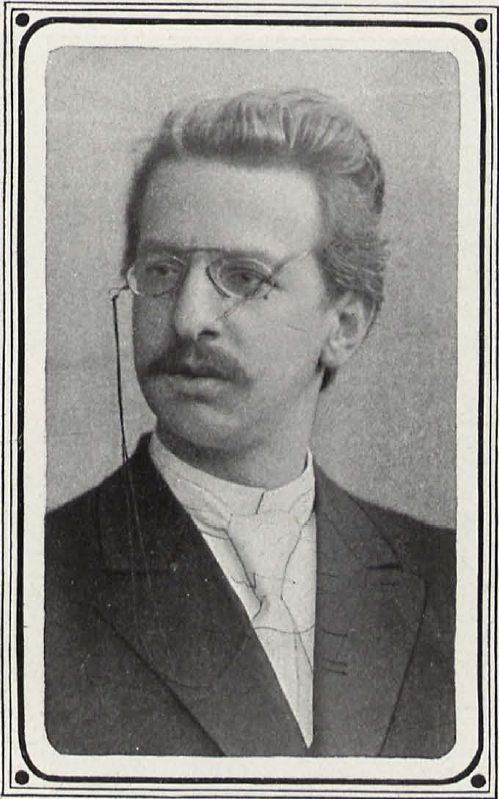
Otto Taubmann, 1905.

Otto Taubmann (8 March 1859 – 4 July 1929) was a German composer and conductor.

== Life ==
Born in Hamburg, Taubmann was initially a merchant, studied piano, violoncello and composition in Dresden from 1879 to 1882 and made study trips to Paris and Vienna. He worked as a conductor for several years and was the owner of the Freudenberg Conservatory in Wiesbaden from 1886 to 1889. From 1895, he lived in Berlin, first as a theory teacher and music critic (among others for the Berliner Börsen-Courier) and from 1920 to 1925 he was a composition teacher at the Berlin University of the Arts.

Taubmann belonged to the music section of the Prussian Academy of Arts from 1917. His students at the academy included Ludwig Roselius and Walter Draeger among others.

Taubmann's compositional output includes sacred and stage music in addition to Lieder and choral works. In addition to psalm settings and the choral drama Sängerweihe published in 1904 after a libretto by Christian von Ehrenfels, the opera Porzia after Shakespeare's The Merchant of Venice was premiered in 1916. Another opera entitled Die missbrauchten Liebesbriefe remained a fragment.

In addition to his own compositions, Taubmann published a large number of arrangements of pieces by other composers, including Heinrich Schütz, Richard Strauss, Jean Sibelius and Antonín Dvořák. The arrangement of his Romance in C op. 42, written in 1909 and republished in 2007, was called "Excellent" by the otherwise very critical Sibelius in a letter to the publisher.

Occasionally, Taubmann used the pseudonym Nambuat.

Taubmann died in Berlin at the age of 70. He found his final resting place on the Stahnsdorf South-Western Cemetery.

== Compositions ==
- Streichquartett a-Moll, 1890
- Eine Deutsche Messe for soli, choir, orchestra and organ, 1899
- Sängerweihe, Choral drama, world premiere 25 November 1904 in Elberfeld
- Und ich sah, Lied, op. 26
- Tauwetter, Choral piece
- Kampf und Friede, Cantata
- Porzia, Opera, premiere 15 November 1916 in Frankfurt.
- Sang an die Heimat, Symphony
- Die missbrauchten Liebesbriefe, Opera fragment after Gottfried Keller
