= Südwestdeutsche Philharmonie Konstanz =

German orchestra

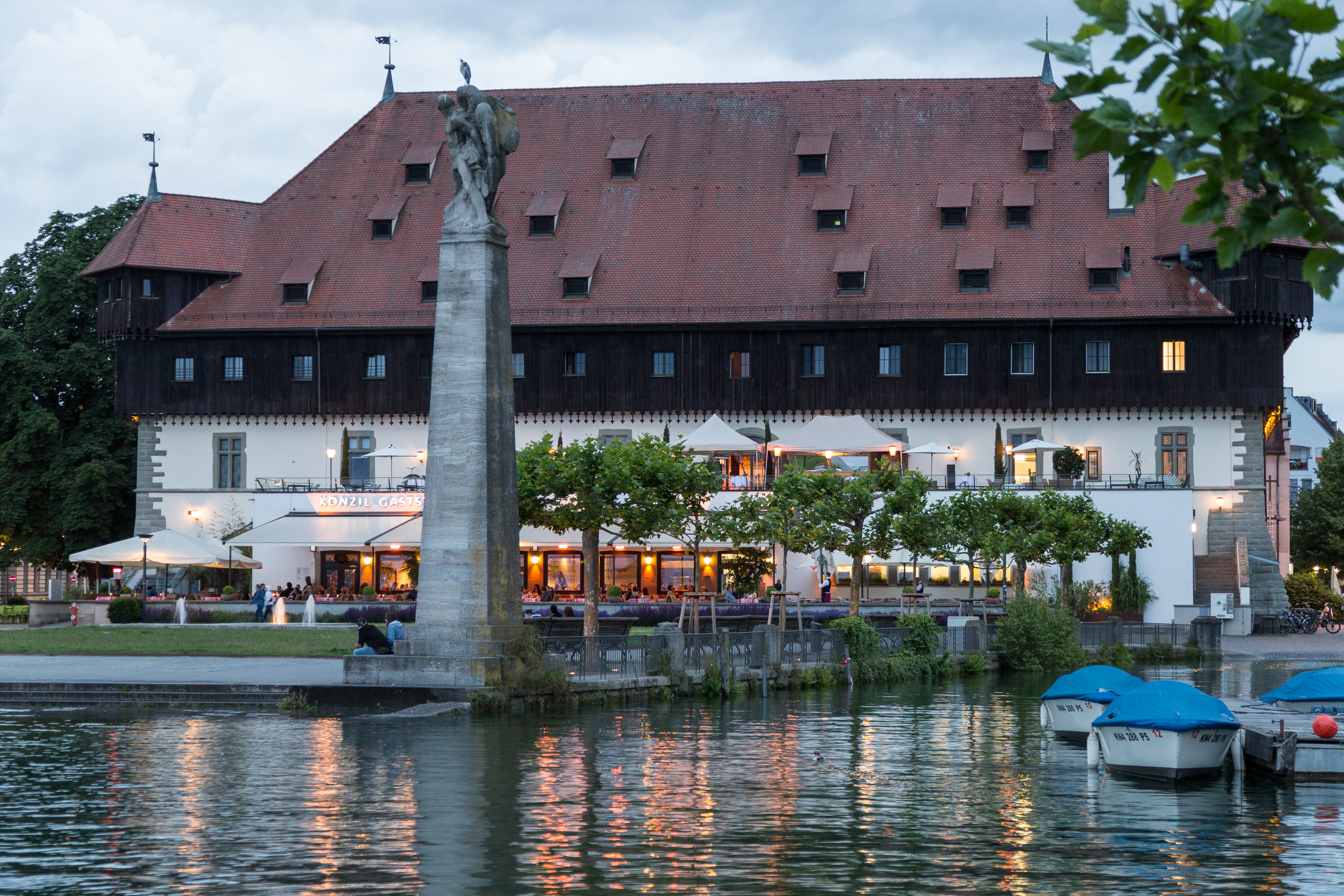
Konzilgebäude Konstanz (2016), main venue of the Südwestdeutschen Philharmonie

The Südwestdeutsche Philharmonie Konstanz is a professional classical orchestra, based in Konstanz on Lake Constance.

== Origin ==
The orchestra was founded in 1932 as the "Theatre and Concert Orchestra" by Hans Rüdinger. After the closure of all German theatres and orchestras in 1944 due to the war, it was re-established in 1945 under the name "Städtisches Orchester Konstanz". From 1949/1950 to 1958, Richard Treiber was the first music director. Between 1959 and 1965, the orchestra under Heinz Hofmann (once Kapellmeister in Halle/DDR), the orchestra achieved national importance and in 1962 was given the name "Bodensee-Symphonie-Orchester" (Lake Constance Symphony Orchestra), which was used until 1988. In 1988 it was renamed the "Southwest German Philharmonic Orchestra of Constance".

== Organisation ==
Since 2006, the Südwestdeutsche Philharmonie Konstanz, which was previously managed by the City of Constance, has been run as an independent enterprise in accordance with the Eigenbetriebsgesetz; the purpose according to the statutes is: "The orchestra has the task of promoting interest in and understanding of symphonic music, of participating in cultural life, especially in Constance and the regions surrounding the city, and of strengthening the cultural cohesion of the countries of the Lake Constance region." The organs of the Eigenbetrieb are the municipal council, the orchestra committee, the mayor and the artistic director. The Südwestdeutsche Philharmonie Konstanz is one of three symphony orchestras funded by the state of Baden-Württemberg. Of the annual budget of EUR 5.9 million in 2013/2014, the city of Konstanz contributed EUR 2.29 million and the state of Baden-Württemberg EUR 2.21 million.

== The Orchestra ==
The orchestra has about 60 permanent musicians. Since the 2016/2017 season, the principal conductor has been Ari Rasilainen.

Florian Riem was artistic director of the Südwestdeutsche Philharmonie from April 2008 to 2012. From October 2012 to August 2013, the position was held on an interim basis by Madeleine Häusler. Since autumn 2013 until the end of the 2017/2018 season took Beat Fehlmann as artistic director, who then went to the Staatsphilharmonie Rheinland-Pfalz. Insa Pijanka has been the orchestra's artistic director since January 2019.

== Concerts ==
The 130 concerts in the 2013/2014 season had 62,836 visitors.

Concerts are held in Constance (Konzilgebäude Konstanz), Kreuzlingen (Kulturzentrum Dreispitz) and other cities, as in the Kongresshaus Zürich (since 1980) and in the Lucerne Culture and Congress Centre (since 2000). Every year the orchestra plays at the Conservatorio Giuseppe Verdi in Milan and at the Bodenseefestival. On concert tours, the orchestra has played at the Schleswig-Holstein Music Festival and the MITO SettembreMusica in Milan/Turin as well as at the Carinthischer Sommer, the Athens Festival and the Festival Internacional de Música de Toledo.

The orchestra performs philharmonic concerts, chamber concerts and various programmes for children and young people, as well as accompanying choral concerts. It has worked with singers such as Anna Netrebko, Montserrat Caballé, Lucia Aliberti, Plácido Domingo, Rolando Villazón and Marcelo Álvarez as well as instrumentalists such as Tabea Zimmermann, Isabelle van Keulen, Sabine Meyer, Rudolf Buchbinder, Boris Pergamenschikow, Christian Tetzlaff, Heinrich Schiff, Bruno Leonardo Gelber, Lars Vogt, Nikolai Lugansky, Tzimon Barto, Christian Lindberg, Vadim Repin, Julian Rachlin, Mischa Maisky and Gidon Kremer.
