= Jan Dahmen =

Dutch violinist

External audio
- Shellac recordings with Jan Dahmen in the Online Archive of the Österreichische Mediathek

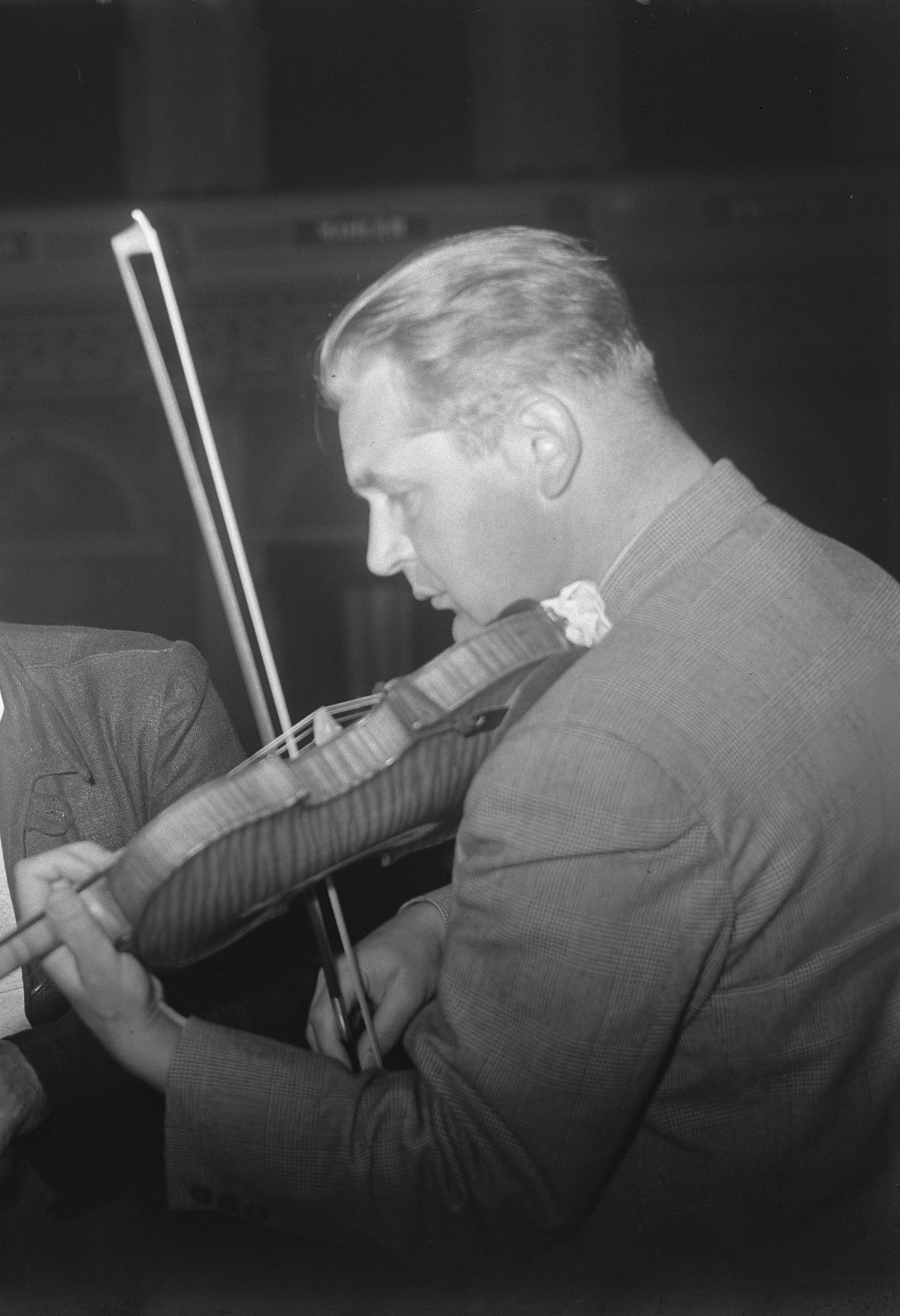
Jan Dahmen (1950)

Jan Dahmen (30 June 1898 – 20 December 1957) was a Dutch violinist. He was the first concertmaster of the Staatskapelle Dresden and of the Royal Concertgebouw Orchestra in Amsterdam.

== Life ==
Born in Breda, Dahmen came from a Dutch family of musicians of German descent. He was a student of André Spoor in The Hague and Carl Flesch in Berlin. In 1916, he won a gold medal in The Hague. At the age of 21 (January 1920) he became concert master II under Arthur Nikisch. of the Berliner Philharmonischen Orchestra. He left the orchestra in August 1922.

In 1922/23, he was primarius of the Dresden String Quartet. From 1924 to 1945, he was 1st concertmaster of the Staatskapelle Dresden, which was conducted during his term of office by Fritz Busch, Karl Böhm and Karl Elmendorff. Tours led him through Europe and to Dutch East Indies. As Primarius, he was the leader of the Jan Dahmen String Quartet from 1938 to 1943. He also taught at the orchestra school of the Sächsische Staatskapelle. His students included among others Horst Förster, Folker Göthel, Henry Meyer, Erich Muck and Wolfgang Schulze).

From 1946 to 1948, Dahmen was concertmaster of the Gothenburg Symphony Orchestra conducted by Issay Dobrowen in Sweden. He was subsequently appointed Concertmaster of the Royal Concertgebouw Orchestra by Eduard van Beinum.
