= Regina (Lortzing) =

1848 opera by Albert Lortzing

- Opera by Albert Lortzing
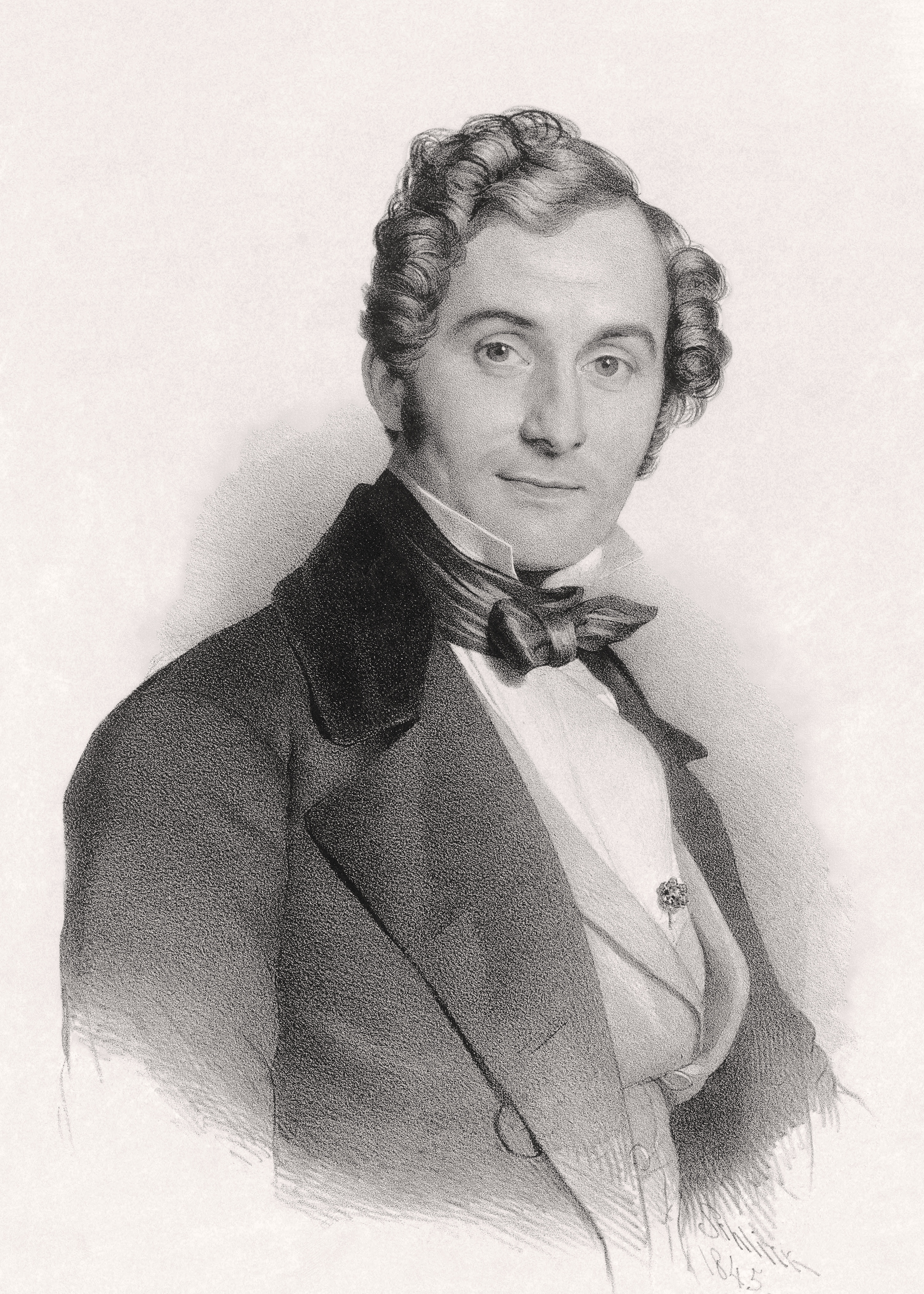
- The composer in 1845
- Librettist: Lortzing
- Language: German
- Based on: German revolutions of 1848–1849
- Premiere: 21 March 1899; Berlin State Opera

Regina is an opera in three acts by Albert Lortzing who also wrote the libretto. It was composed in 1848, the year of the revolutions in the German states and during Europe's "Springtime of the Peoples" (Völkerfrühling), but it was not premiered until 21 March 1899 when it was performed at the Berlin State Opera. It is a Freiheitsoper (liberation opera) and the first opera which takes place in a factory with workers who strike and chant freedom songs. The first production of the original opera was in 1998 at the Musiktheater im Revier in Gelsenkirchen.

== Roles ==
Roles, voice types
| Role | Voice type |
|---|---|
| Simon, a rich factory owner | bass |
| Regina, his daughter | soprano |
| Stephan, a foreman | baritone |
| Richard, a foreman and Regina's fiancé | tenor |
| Wolfgang, leader of a free corps | tenor |
| Kilian, a clerk | tenorbuffo |
| Beate, a housemaid | soprano |
| Barbara, a peasant woman | contralto |
| a maidservant | mezzo-soprano |
Workers, francs-tireurs, soldiers, citizens and servants

== Synopsis ==
=== Act 1 ===
In the beginning of the opera, workers are on strike and demand higher wages and general changes in the society. The foreman Richard, who is betrothed with Regina, the daughter of the factory owner, is able to appease the irate mood of the crowd. Another foreman, Stephan, who is also in love with Regina, joins a free corps that consists of political insurgents and occupies the factory. Moderate and radical workers face each other. A battle begins during which the factory is set on fire and Regina kidnapped.

=== Act 2 ===
In act 2, Stephan and Regina are in a remote cabin. Regina tries to convince her abductor to change his mind when suddenly a simple employee enters the cabin and is mocked by the soldiers. Stephan leaves together with Regina.

=== Act 3 ===
The two attain an ammunition dump Stephan intends to use as a hideout. Richard and his men, keen to liberate Regina, approach their hiding place and surround it whereupon Stephan threatens everyone to blow up the ammunition dump. Regina, however, shoots him before he is able to undertake the atrocity. The workers cheerfully chant paeans and songs of liberty. The opera closes with a patriotic song exalting the fight for a united and democratic Germany:

RICHARD
Heil, Freiheit, dir, du Völkerzier,
Dir leben wir, dir sterben wir.
Fließ hin, o Blut, fließ in den Sand,
O süßer Tod fürs Vaterland,
O schöner Tod der Ehre.
O Glanz, o Sieg, o helle Ruhmesbahn!
Auf, Vaterland, voran!
Auf, Vaterland, voran!

CHOR
O Glanz, o Sieg, o helle Ruhmesbahn!
Auf, Vaterland, voran!
Auf, Vaterland, voran!

RICHARD
Hail to thee, freedom, adornment of all peoples,
For thee we live, for thee we die.
Flow, o blood, flow to the ground,
O sweet death for the fatherland,
O beautiful death of honour.
O brightness, o victory, o path of glory!
Forward, fatherland, forward!
Forward, fatherland, forward!

CHOIR
O brightness, o victory, o path of glory!
Forward, fatherland, forward!
Forward, fatherland, forward!

RICHARD
Frisch auf, frisch auf, und einig seid,
So kommt dem Volk die Herrlichkeit!
Ein Herz, ein Sinn und ein Panier,
In diesem Zeichen siegen wir,
Das macht den Feind zuschanden.
O Glanz, o Sieg, o helle Ruhmesbahn!
Auf, Vaterland, voran!
Auf, Vaterland, voran!

CHOR
O Glanz, o Sieg, o helle Ruhmesbahn!
Auf, Vaterland, voran!
Auf, Vaterland, voran!

RICHARD
Forward, forward, and be united,
So that the people will hold all glory!
One heart, one mind and one flag,
The sign with which we triumph
And which devastates our foe.
O brightness, o victory, o path of glory!
Forward, fatherland, forward!
Forward, fatherland, forward!

CHOIR
O brightness, o victory, o path of glory!
Forward, fatherland, forward!
Forward, fatherland, forward!

RICHARD UND CHOR
Auf, rüstet euch, das Schwert zur Hand,
Im Sturmschritt vor das Vaterland.
Ein Volk, ein Heer, ein Wetterschlag,
Nun kommt der Freiheit großer Tag,
Das Volk lässt sich nicht spalten.
O Glanz o Sieg o helle Ruhmesbahn!
Auf, Vaterland, voran!
Auf, Vaterland, voran!

RICHARD AND CHOIR
Forward, arm yourself and grab the sword,
Let us protect the fatherland with hasty pace.
One people, one army, one thunderous fight
Now freedom's heyday approaches,
The people will not be divided.
O brightness, o victory, o path of glory!
Forward, fatherland, forward!
Forward, fatherland, forward!

== Reception ==
Regina is a Freiheitsoper (opera of liberty) and the first opera which takes place in a factory with striking workers and protagonists chanting songs of liberty. Although written in 1848, it was not staged until 21 March 1899. Due to political reasons, Regina was edited heavily by Adolphe L'Arronge. Whereas the choir sang "Hail to thee, liberty!" in Lortzing's version, for example, L'Arronge changed it to "Long live Blücher!". Later editions were also heavily manipulated in order to fit the respective zeitgeist and the régime in power. The first staging of the original opera occurred on 13 March 1998 at the Musiktheater im Revier Gelsenkirchen, directed by Peter Konwitschny.

== Recordings ==
- Regina. Choir and orchestra of the Berliner Rundfunk, Walter Schartner (cond.). 1951 (mono). Cantus Classics/Line Music 5.00825
- Regina. Munich Radio Orchestra, Ulf Schirmer (cond.). 2011. cpo 777 710-2
