= Volker Rohde =

German conductor

Volker Rohde (4 May 1939 – 22 October 2000) was a German conductor and academic teacher. After being principal conductor of the Orchester des Opernhauses Halle from 1976 to 1979, he subsequently served as deputy principal conductor at the Semper Oper Dresden and as musical director at the Oper Leipzig.

== Life ==
Rohde was born in Greifswald. He studied with Willy Niepold and Horst Förster at the Hochschule für Musik "Hanns Eisler".

In 1962/63, he became solo répétiteur at the Landestheater Altenburg. He then moved to the Komische Oper Berlin. From 1968 to 1970, he was choral director at the Theater Plauen-Zwickau, where he made his debut as an opera conductor in 1969 with the opera buffa Il barbiere di Siviglia by Giovanni Paisiello. In 1970, he became first Kapellmeister in Zwickau. From 1972 to 1976, he was first Kapellmeister at the Semperoper Dresden. Subsequently, he became musical director in Halle. As such, he was chief conductor of the Halle Opera House Orchestra from 1976 to 1979. In 1978 he conducted Handel's opera Radamisto in a production by Martin Schneider. On the occasion of the Handel Festival, Halle. In 1981/82, he took over the musical direction of the Christian Pöppelreiter production of Heinrich Ignaz Franz Biber's Arminius at the Komische Oper Berlin. In 1981, he conducted with the Dresden Philharmonic Orchestra Günter Neubert's Lessing Fables for tenor, choir and orchestra (with Joachim Vogt). In 1983, he became deputy chief conductor of the Dresden State Opera. Together with the Kammerharmonie der Staatskapelle Dresden, he opened the Dresden Music Festival in 1984 with the world premiere of Weiss's Music for Eight Winds. In 1990, he became musical director at the Oper Leipzig. After Lothar Zagrosek's resignation as general music director in 1992, he took over the duties of the artistic director Udo Zimmermann at his request. His repertoire included among others Wagner, Rossini and Mozart. In 1992, he conducted the premiere of the John Dew production of Mozart's Così fan tutte in Leipzig. With Ligeti's Le Grand Macabre, he also took over the conducting at a contemporary opera. "The experienced but artistically pale" Rohde, according to Fritz Hennenberg, however, then had to give way to Jiří Kout.

In 1988, he was appointed professor at the Hochschule für Musik Carl Maria von Weber Dresden as professor with artistic teaching duties. He then taught at the University of Music and Theatre Leipzig, where teaching duties in conducting were combined with conducting the university symphony orchestra, which he chaired from 1992 to 1997, succeeding Christian Kluttig. From 1998, he was at the Staatliche Hochschule für Musik Trossingen. He also worked in Leipzig (1992) and Reutlingen (1998) as artistic director for orchestral conductors of the Dirigentenforum of the Deutscher Musikrat. Among his students were Roland Kluttig Henrik Schaefer and Gernot Schulz.

Guest tours took him all over Europe as a conductor and song accompanist. He also made numerous radio recordings.

Rohde was married and father of one child.

== Awards ==
- 1969: Second place at the Dresden Carl Maria von Weber Competition for Conductors.
- 1974: Fourth place at the International Conducting Competition in Budapest, announced by the ungarische Fernsehen
