= Heribert Esser =

German conductor

Heribert Esser (born 12 January 1929) is a German conductor and academic teacher. In 1962–1986, he held the position of director of music at Braunschweig, and the Elder Chair of Music at the Elder Conservatorium of Music of the University of Adelaide, South Australia, from 1987 to 1994. Most recently he conducted the Philharmonisches Staatsorchester Halle.

== Life ==
Esser was born in 1929 as the son of civil servant Edmund Esser and his wife Gertrud, née Krahforst, in Rheinhausen (today Duisburg). After obtaining his Abitur in 1947 at the Städtisch mathematisch-naturwissenschaftliches Gymnasium Rheinhausen, he studied until 1952 at the Hochschule für Musik und Tanz Köln, and German and musicology at the University of Cologne. His conducting teacher was Günter Wand. He also attended a masterclass with Karl Hermann Pillney and the chamber music seminars of Maurits Frank. He received his first engagement in 1953 at theatres in Freiburg im Breisgau. From 1954, he was répétiteur with conducting duties in Cologne. In 1958, he became first Kapellmeister and assistant to Wolfgang Sawallisch at the Hessisches Staatstheater Wiesbaden. In 1961 he moved with Sawallisch to the Städtische Bühnen Köln.

In 1962, he succeeded Arthur Grüber at the Staatstheater Braunschweig. At the time, he was, at 33, one of the youngest general music directors in the Federal Republic. and held this office for 25 years. He was also artistic director of the Tage Neuer Kammermusik Braunschweig from 1984 to 1986. Furthermore, he was variously active as a guest conductor. In 1965, he made his debut with the Berlin Philharmonic Orchestra. In 1969, for a recording of Paganini's Violin Concertos Nos. 1 and 2, he conducted the Vienna Symphony Orchestra (soloist Shmuel Ashkenasi). From 1975 to 1985, he was permanent guest conductor with the Orchester Musikkollegium Winterthur.

From 1987 to 1994, he succeeded David Galliver as music professor (Elder Chair of Music) at the Elder Conservatorium of Music at the University of Adelaide in South Australia, serving as its director from 1988 to 1992. In 2000, he was editor of the work The Art of Performance by Heinrich Schenker.

In 2004, he succeeded Wolf-Dieter Hauschild as Chief Conductor of the Philharmonisches Staatsorchester Halle, which was about to undergo an orchestral merger. After his guest conducting in 2005/06, the orchestra was transferred to the Staatskapelle Halle.

Esser, a Catholic, has been married to Rosemarie, née Clormann, since 1958.

== Awards ==
- 1988: Ludwig-Spohr-Preis der Stadt Braunschweig.
