= Das Tal der sieben Monde =

1966 film

- Directed by: Gottfried Kolditz
- Music by: Gerhard Wohlgemuth
- Release date: 1966
- Country: East Germany
- Language: German

Das Tal der sieben Monde is an East German film. It was released in 1966.
