= Johannes Kalitzke =

German composer and conductor (born 1959)

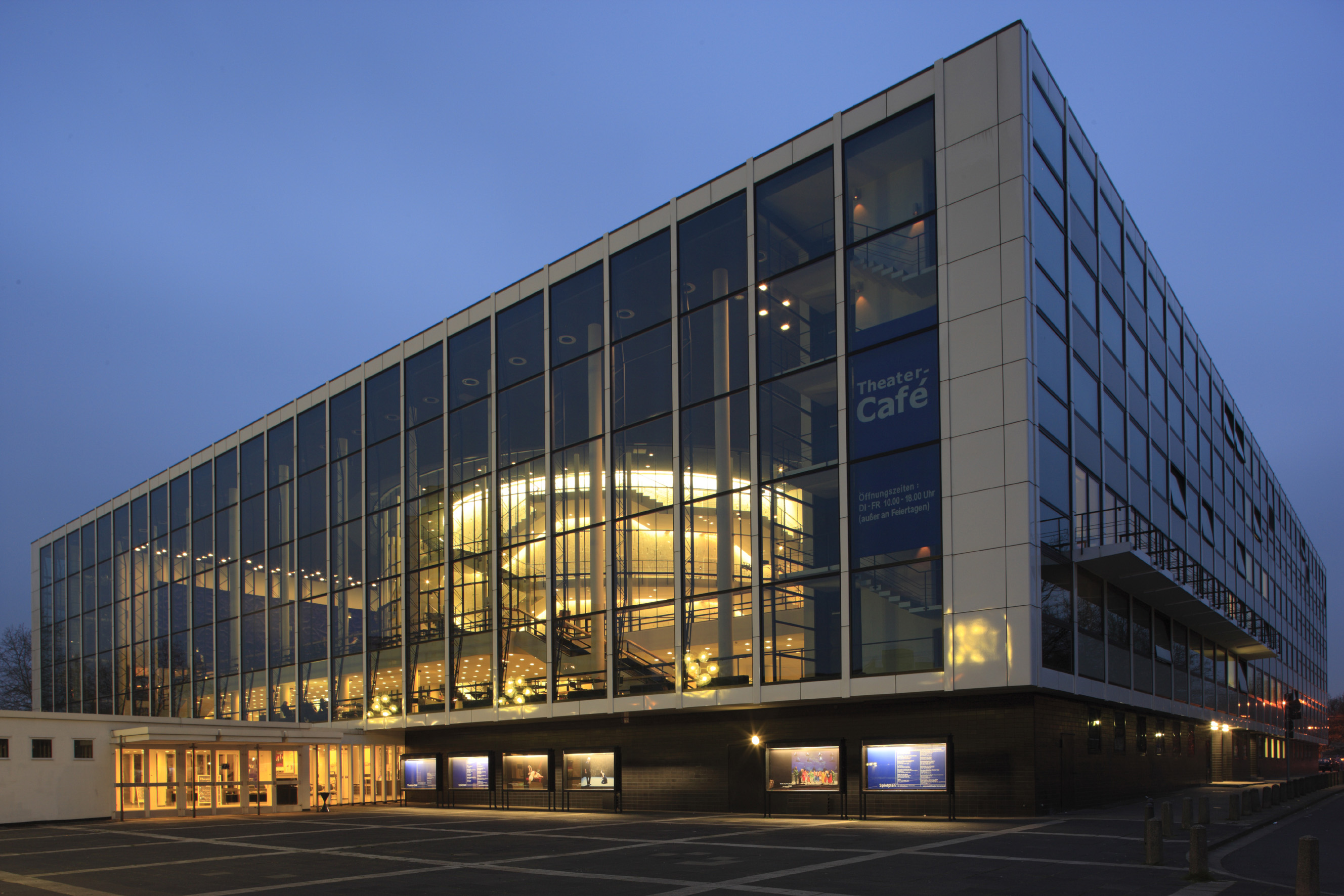
- Musiktheater im Revier in Gelsenkirchen, where Kalitzke was chief conductor
- Born: 12 February 1959 (age 67); Cologne, Germany
- Education: Musikhochschule Köln
- Occupations: Pianist; Conductor; Composer; Academic
- Organizations: Musiktheater im Revier; Forum für Neue Musik; musikFabrik; Darmstädter Ferienkurse; Mozarteum
- Awards: Villa Massimo; Academy of the Arts, Berlin; Bavarian Academy of Fine Arts
- Website: www.johanneskalitzke.com

Johannes Kalitzke (born 12 February 1959) is a German composer and conductor. After studying in Cologne and at the IRCAM in Paris, he was chief conductor at the Musiktheater im Revier in Gelsenkirchen for several years, then led the ensemble musikFabrik and composed operas on commissions in Germany and Austria. He has been Professor of Conducting (Contemporary Music) at the Salzburg Mozarteum from 2015.

== Early life ==
Born in Cologne, Kalitzke trained on the piano from 1967 to 1977 with Jeanette Chéro and studied church music in Cologne from 1974 to 1976. He studied further at the Musikhochschule Köln from 1978 to 1981, studying piano with Aloys Kontarsky, conducting with Wolfgang von der Nahmer, and composition with York Höller, and later electronic music with Ulrich Humpert. He focused on electronic music at the IRCAM in Paris with Vinko Globokar in 1982–83, on a scholarship of the Studienstiftung des Deutschen Volkes.

== Career ==
From 1984 to 1990, Kalitze was first Kapellmeister and then chief conductor at the Musiktheater im Revier in Gelsenkirchen. From 1986, he was also the leader of the Forum für Neue Musik there, succeeding Carla Henius. From 1991, he was artistic director of the ensemble musikFabrik. Since 1996, he has taught at the Darmstädter Ferienkurse and held master classes at several universities of music, and for Deutscher Musikrat.

His first opera, Bericht über den Tod des Musikers Jack Tiergarten, premiered at the Munich Biennale in 1996. On a commission from the state of Schleswig-Holstein, he composed his second opera, Molière oder die Henker der Komödianten, which premiered in Bremen in 1998, as did his opera Inferno in 2004. In 2007, Kalitzke received a commission from Theater an der Wien to compose Die Besessenen after Witold Gombrowicz, which premiered on 19 February 2010.

His fifth opera, Pym, based on Edgar Allan Poe's novel The Narrative of Arthur Gordon Pym of Nantucket, premiered in Heidelberg in May 2016. The story is told by nine male singers and by dancers, while a quartet with also female voices performs from behind the scene. Online Musik Magazin wrote that Kalitzke's score "could be a musical representation of the world of Hieronymus Bosch."

Kalitzke has been a professor of conducting contemporary music at the Mozarteum in Salzburg from 2015.

== Awards ==
- 1990 Bernd Alois Zimmermann Scholarship of Cologne
- 2003 Villa Massimo Fellowship
- 2009 Member of the Academy of the Arts, Berlin
- 2015 Member of the Bavarian Academy of Fine Arts

== Compositions ==
Kalitzke's works are held by the German National Library:

- Spiegelbild (1979)
- De Profundis (1980/86)
- Macchina d’autunno (1982)
- Berceuse intégrale pour Hieronymus Bosch (1982/83)
- Trio Infernal (1985)
- Rotationsetüde (1985/86)
- Die Hundertjahrfeier der Nacht (1986)
- Jardins Paradoxaux (1986)
- Das Labyrinth der Lieder (1987)
- Tübingen, Jänner (1988)
- Nachtschleife (1989)
- Bis zum äußersten Tor, Kafka-Komplex for solo voices, viola, piano and Zuspiel (1989–2006)
- Salto, Trapez, Ikarus (1990)
- Bericht über den Tod des Musikers Jack Tiergarten (1991)
- Hände im Spiegel (1992/93)
- Die Rückseite der Tage (1994)
- Moliere oder die Henker der Komödianten (1994–97)
- Chasse Royale (1995)
- Circus Frenzy (1995)
- Cruxification I (1997)
- Schuberts Traum – Stilleben mit Inferno nach einem Tagebuchtext von Franz Schubert, für Stimmen und Ensemble (Schubert's Dream – Still life with inferno after a diary text by Franz Schubert, for voices and ensemble, 1999)
- Six Covered Settings (1999/2000)
- Vier Toteninseln (2002/03)
- memoria (2003)
- Inferno, musical stage work after the play by Peter Weiss (2004)
- Ortswechsel (2007)
- Die Besessenen, opera (2009, premiered in 2010)
- Figuren am Horizont, for violin solo and six instrumentalists
- Die Weber, music to the silent film by Friedrich Zelnik (1927) for chamber orchestra (2011/12)
- Angels Burnout Graffiti for ensemble (2012)
- Pym (2013/2015), opera (premiered in 2016)
