= Heinz Hofmann =

20th-century German conductor

Heinz Hofmann (1917–1967) was a German conductor. After artistic engagements with the Philharmonisches Staatsorchester Halle and the Südwestdeutsche Philharmonie Konstanz, he was most recently permanent conductor of the Tokyo Metropolitan Symphony Orchestra.

== Life ==
Hofmann was born in 1917 as the son of a chamber musician in Wrocław and grew up in Halle and Dresden. After the Abitur, he attended the orchestral school of the Staatskapelle Dresden. There he was a pupil of Hermann Ludwig Kutzschbach. In 1939, he was drafted into the Luftwaffe of the Wehrmacht. He became a US prisoner of war, which he remained until 1946.

After the Second World War he worked at the Theater Plauen-Zwickau and in Zeitz. Under Walter Schartner in 1949/50, he was initially deputy principal conductor and after his departure in 1950, he became provisional principal conductor of the Philharmonisches Staatsorchester Halle. Schartner's official successor became Werner Gößling.

In 1953, Hofmann moved to the BRD "because of political danger", as he stated. After being selected from a group of guest conductors, he succeeded music director Richard Treiber at the Constance Municipal Orchestra (from 1962 Südwestdeutsche Philharmonie Konstanz) in 1959 (from 1962, the Southwest German Philharmonic Orchestra of Constance), whose position had already been advertised since 1956. According to Robert Heinze, "a personal feud" between a concert pianist who had probably been passed over and the music director led to a scandal. Hofmann was reproached for falsely holding the title of Generalmusikdirektor, which he had never received in the GDR. A reticent city and the realities of Inner-German relations did not help to quickly clarify the facts of the case.

After his call to Tokyo, Hofmann resigned from Konstanz and worked from 1965 to 1967 as one of two Permanent Conductors of the newly founded Tokyo Metropolitan Symphony Orchestra.

== Recordings ==
- Felix Mendelssohn Bartholdy: Violin Concerto E minor (Saphir 1977) with the Südwestdeutsche Philharmonie Konstanz and Wolfgang Marschner
