= Ludwig Roselius (composer) =

German composer and conductor (1902 – 1977)

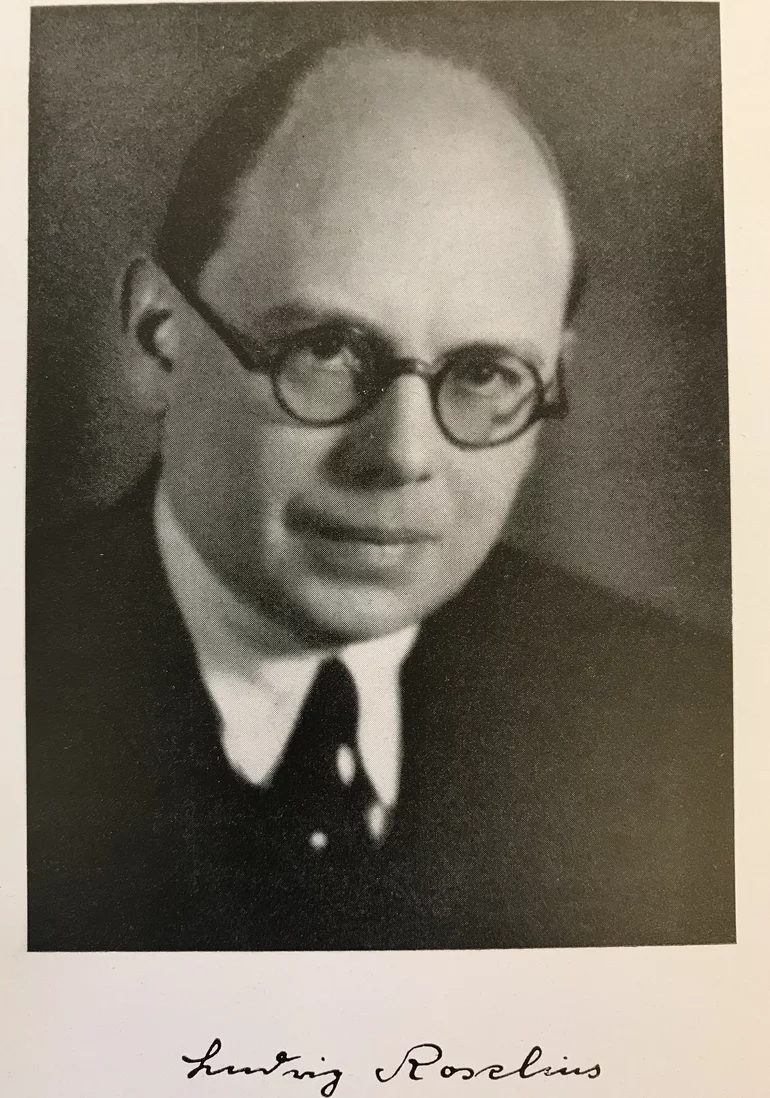
- Picture of Ludwig Roselius, alongside his signature, as it appears in Carl Niessen, ed., Die deutsche Oper der Gegenwart, 1944

Background information
- Born: 2 August 1902; Kassel, German Empire
- Died: 6 February 1977 (aged 74) Bremen, West Germany

Ludwig Roselius (2 August 1902 – 6 February 1977) was a German composer and conductor.

== Life and career ==
Roselius was born in Kassel, the son of the merchant Georg Roselius and a relative of the coffee magnate Ludwig Roselius. He was a répétiteur at the Deutsche Opernhaus Berlin for the 1921/1922 season. He studied composition with Georg Schumann at the Prussian Academy of the Arts from 1921 to 1923, and received a PhD from Friedrich-Wilhelms-Universität Berlin on the subject of the motets of Andreas Raselius in 1924. He achieved his greatest success with the stage works Godiva and especially Gudrun, which was premièred in Graz in 1938 and performed again in Berlin. He was drafted into the Wehrmacht in 1941 and ended World War II as a prisoner of war.

After the war, he became a fixture of musical life in Bremen, working as a music critic, freelance composer, conductor, and musical director of the Bremer Künstlertheater. He received the Bremer Musikpreis in 1964 in recognition of his contributions. Roselius died 6 February 1977 in Bremen.

== Selected works ==
=== Stage works ===
- Doge und Dogaressa, première Dortmund 1928
- Godiva, opera, première Nuremberg 1933
- Gudrun, Eine deutsche Ballade in zwei Akten (fünf Bilder), première Graz 1938

=== Songs ===
- Geistliche Gesänge, op. 11 (für Singstimme, Viola, und Klavier)
- Drei Lieder for soprano and piano (or orchestra), op. 13
- Drei heitere Lieder für Singstimme und Klavier, op. 14
- Lieder der Andacht for baritone and piano, op. 15
- 2 Balladen, op. 19 (für Singstimme und Klavier)
- Stunden einer Liebe. Lieder und Duette for soprano, baritone, and piano, op. 20
- Glück und Klage, op. 29 (6 Lieder im Volkston for 4-8 part choir a cappella)
- Die Bremer Stadtmusikanten, op. 32 (Humoreske für Singstimme und Klavier)

=== Orchestral works ===
- Lilofee-Suite. Märchenmusik für Orchester nach Manfred Hausmanns dramatischer Ballade, op. 16
- Sinfonisches Vorspiel (Von einer Königstochter im Hegelingenland / on Motives from the opera Gudrun), op. 18
- Der dunkle Reigen, op. 23 (Totentanzsuite)
- Festliche Intrade for speaker, choir, and orchestra
- Zwischen Meer und Moor, op. 27 (Niederdeutsche Suite für Orchester)
- Friesische Musik, op. 30
- Es waren zwei Königskinder, op. 31 (Fantasie für Orchester)

=== Instrumental works ===
- Variationen für Klavier über ein deutsches Volkslied, op. 8
- Sonate for piano B minor, op. 12
