= Senftöpfchen =

Theatre in Cologne, Germany

Coordinates: 50°56′23″N 6°57′39″E

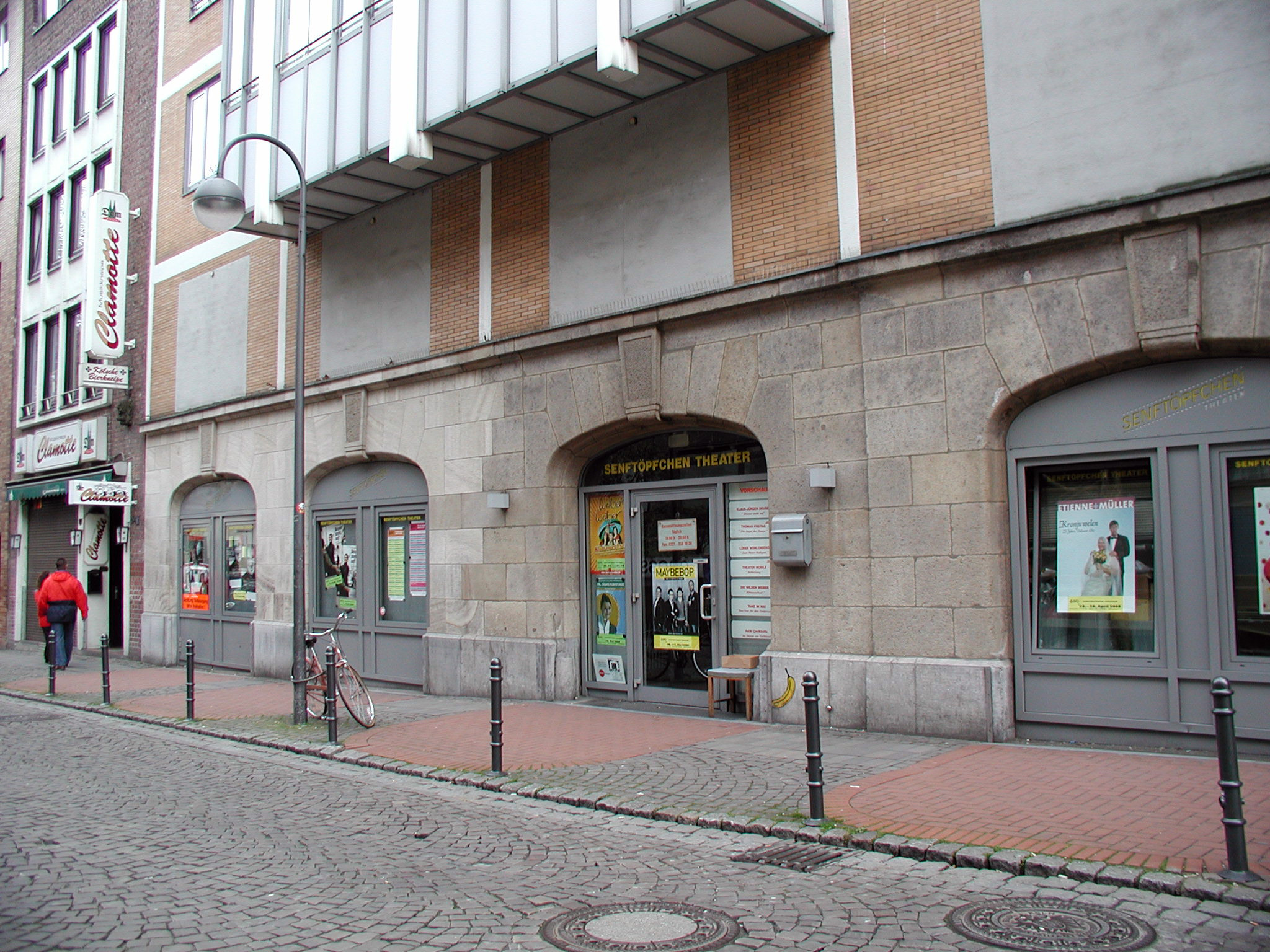
Senftöpfchen-Köln

Senftöpfchen is a theatre in Cologne, North Rhine-Westphalia, Germany.
