= Walter Draeger =

German composer and music educator (1888-1976)

Walter Draeger (14 December 1888 – 24 January 1976) was a German composer and music educator. Er war Professor an der Staatliche Hochschule für Theater und Musik Halle and the Hochschule für Musik Franz Liszt, Weimar. In 1955, war er Mitinitiator der ersten Hallische Musiktage.

== Life ==
Draeger was born in 1888 as the son of a teacher and organist in Batzlow near Freienwalde in the Province of Brandenburg. From 1898, he lived in Berlin, where he lived until the Reifeprüfung from the Sophien-Gymnasium und Realgymnasium. Von 1908 bis 1913 studierte er Geschichte, Romance studies and musicology an der Friedrich-Wilhelms-Universität zu Berlin. In 1913, he was awarded his doctorate there with the dissertation Das alte lübische Stadtrecht und seine Quellen Die Referenten der Arbeit waren Dietrich Schäfer and Michael Tangl. During his studies, he spent two years in Grenoble and Paris (Sorbonne). Until 1944, he was active as a Studienrat at the Friedrichswerdersches Gymnasium in Berlin.

After the First World War, he was musically trained by Otto Taubmann at the Berlin University of the Arts and by Franz Schreker. It was only after 1945 that he emerged as a composer. From 1949 to 1952, he taught music theory and composition at the Quedlinburg Conservatory. In 1952, he moved to the Staatliche Hochschule für Theater und Musik Halle, where he was appointed a professor in 1953. From 1955 to 1963, he taught music theory and composition at the Hochschule für Musik Franz Liszt, Weimar. He retired in 1958.

In terms of composition, Draeger devoted himself in particular to instrumental music. On the one hand, he dealt with the Volkslied. On the other hand, a connection "to traditional genres as well as an inclination to classicist thinking and simple, transparent fracture" (Grützner 2004) can be recognised. From 1925, his chamber music and song cycle were broadcast on the Funk-Stunde Berlin. The majority of his early works, however, were destroyed in his Berlin flat during the war in 1944. According to Gilbert Stöck, he "sometimes distanced himself critically from some of the dogmas of Socialist realism"; the composer pursued a neo-Romantic style.

In 1951, he was elected to the central committee of the Verband der Komponisten und Musikwissenschaftler der DDR (VDK). Außerdem war er Gründungs- und Vorstandsmitglied des Arbeitskreises Halle im VDK und als solcher neben Fritz Reuter, Walther Siegmund-Schultze, Gerhard Wohlgemuth und anderen einer der Initiatoren der 1955 veranstalteten 1. Hallische Musiktage. From 1956 to 1959, he served as the first chairman of the Thuringia district association of the VDK.

Draeger was married to Eva, née Hartmann, and was the father of a son. The composer died in Weimar at the age of 87.

== Awards ==
- 1955: Kunstpreis der Stadt Halle (für den Liederkreis Doris und Damon)
- 1970: Literatur- und Kunstpreis der Stadt Weimar
- Ehrennadel in Gold des Verbandes Deutscher Komponisten und Musikwissenschaftler
- Ehrenmitglied des Verbandes Deutscher Komponisten und Musikwissenschaftler

== Work ==
=== Orchestral music ===
- Sinfonietta for stringed instruments, 1947
- Sinfonie, 1957
- Ein ernstes Vorspiel, 1961
- Suite after motifs of the opera In Schilda ist der Teufel los, 1962
- Suite for chamber string orchestra, 1962
- Temperaturen for 18 winds, harp and double bass, 1964
- Capriccio diabolico, 1972

=== Concertante music ===
- for flute and string orchestra, 1931
- Kleines Lehrbuch der Zoologie for violin and small orchestra, 1937
- for piano and orchestra, 1952
- for violin and orchestra, 1956
- for violoncello and orchestra, 1961

=== Chamber music ===
- Divertimento for violin and piano, 1940
- Introduction and Rondo for wind quartet, 1942
- Altdeutsche Tanz- und Liebeslieder for violin, viola and piano, 1942
- Quartet for wind instruments, 1947
- 3 string quartets, 1951; 1957; 1969
- 3 Miniatures for oboe and piano, 1956
- Concertino for 5 winds, 1962
- Rondo Vorwiegend Heiter for 5 winds after old German street calls and craft songs, 1963

=== Piano ===
- Konzert für 2 Klaviere, 1950
- Quedlinburger Klavierbuch, 1950

=== Opera ===
- In Schilda ist der Teufel los, 1959/62

=== Vocal music ===
- Anacreontic Rhapsody for baritone and small orchestra, 1938
- Peasant Legends for male choir and wind orchestra, 1948
- Doris and Damon for soprano, oboe and orchestra, 1949
- Eternal Circle for soprano and orchestra, 1954
- Zwiegesang for soprano, violin and piano, 1957
- Love never ends for soprano and string quartet, 1960
- In memoriam for voice and chamber orchestra, 1967

== Publications ==
- Das alte lübische Stadtrecht und seine Quellen. In Hansische Geschichtsblätter 19 (1913), pp. 1–91. (Berliner Dissertation, 1913)
