= Walter Schartner =

German conductor and composer (1894–1970)

Walter Schartner (3 December 1894 – 24 May 1970) was a German conductor, composer and Hochschullehrer. In 1946, he was appointed Generalmusikdirektor in Halle and as such he directed the Orchestra of the Halle Opera House. In 1949/50, he was chief conductor of the Philharmonisches Staatsorchester Halle.

== Life ==
Schartner was born in Berlin in 1894. There he attended the Stern Conservatory where Leo Blech was his main teacher. A first Kapellmeister position in Königsberg was followed by posts in Münster and Bremerhaven. In 1926, he conducted the Hans Rudolf Waldburg production of Handel's opera Rodelinda in Bremerhaven. From 1928 to 1944, he worked in Görlitz. In 1928, he became musical director of the Theatre Görlitz, and in 1930 took over the symphony concerts.

In 1945, Schartner was appointed director of the Hochschule für Musik Carl Maria von Weber Dresden. Guest conducting led him among others at the Semperoper and the Dresden Philharmonic. After a guest performance in Halle in 1946, he received his appointment as Municipal Music Director by the Lord Mayor of Halle, Karl Pretzsch at the suggestion of the Theatre Committee. In June 1946, he conducted his first symphony concert in Halle. Following a proposal by Pretzsch, the president of the province of Saxony, Erhard Hübener, appointed him Generalmusikdirektor in September 1946. In 1948, he conducted the premiere of Handels Xerses at the Thalia Theater; the production was directed by Sigurd Baller. In Halle, he also made a name for himself as a composer, and in 1948 his opera Und Pippa tanzt based on And Pippa dances! eponymous play by Gerhart Hauptmann was premiered at the Landestheater. He also headed the opera department at the Staatliche Hochschule für Theater und Musik Halle. In April 1949, Richard Schallock, the Minister for National Education, Arts and Science, declared that his contract as general music director would not be renewed. Nevertheless, he was appointed artistic director of the Philharmonic State Orchestra Halle in 1949/50.

In 1950, Schartner received a proposition from the Hochschule für Musik Carl Maria von Weber. In 1950/51, he was conductor of the {Loh-Orchester Sondershausen. After that, he was conductor of the Berliner Rundfunk. In 1951, together with the Berlin Radio Choir and the Berlin Radio Symphony Orchestra he presented the complete opera recording of ' Lortzing's Regina. Later he was 1st Kapellmeister and Musical Director of the Volkspark Rehberge in West Berlin.

Until his death, Schartner was married with the composer, pianist, lyricist and chanson interpreter Jeanette Chéro (born 1927, née Roscher, civil name Christiane Schartner).

Cultural offices
Preceded by Heinz Hofmann	Music Director, Staatsorchester Halle; 1949–1950	Succeeded by Heinz Hofmann
