= Joachim Widlak =

German conductor

Joachim Johannes Hermann Widlak (30 March 1930 – 21 October 2011) was a German conductor.

Born in Breslau, Widlak received his musical education at the Staatliche Hochschule für Theater und Musik Halle, where he attended the conducting class of Werner Gößling.

From 1953 to 1959, he worked as a conductor in Magdeburg. From 1959 onwards, he was engaged at the Landesbühnen Sachsen in Radebeul, first as Kapellmeister, then from 1966 to 1994 as music director.
