= St. Moritz, Halle =

St. Moritz
- St. Mauritius
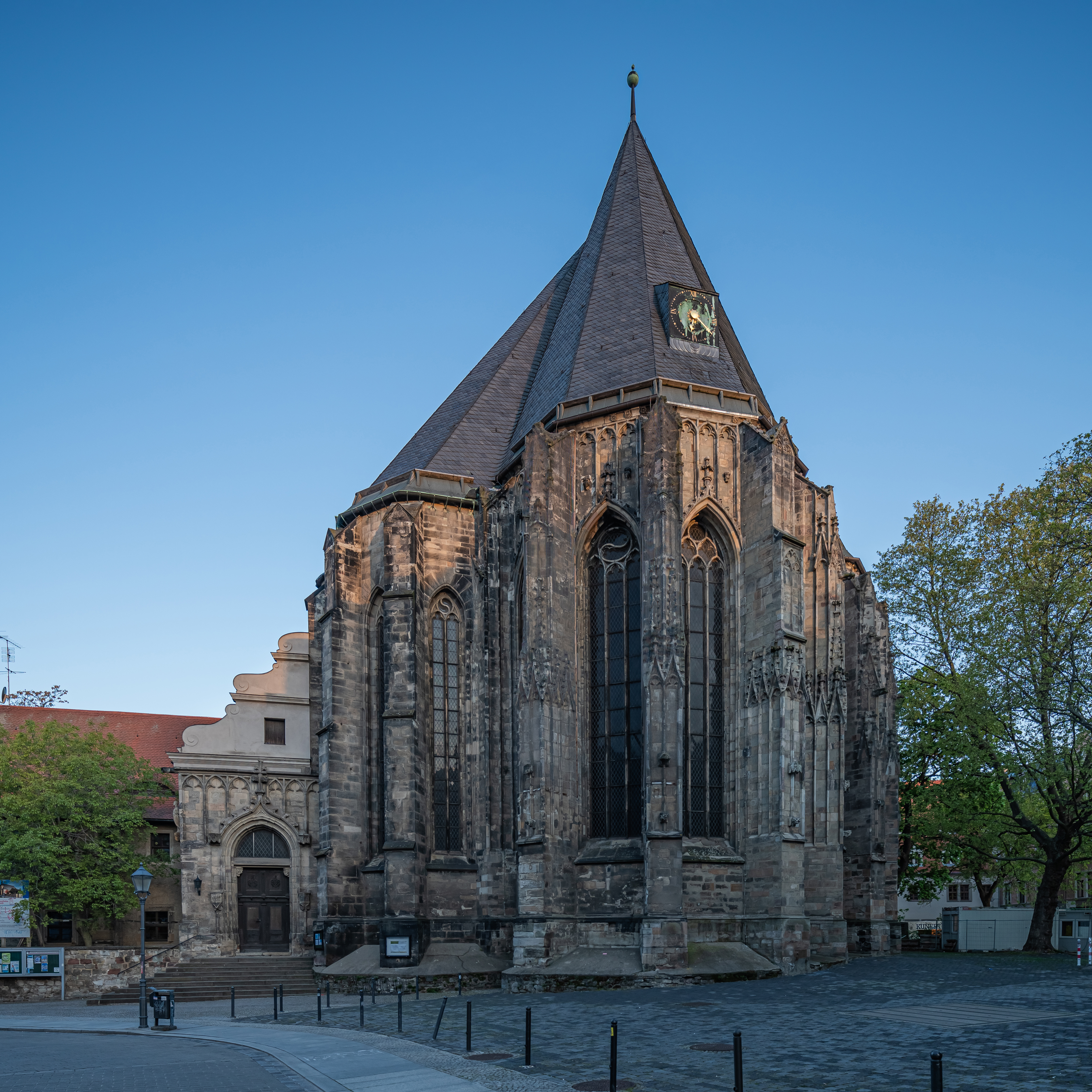
- The church from the east
- St. Moritz
- 51.4802°N 11.9663°E
- Location: Halle (Saale), Sachsen-Anhalt
- Country: Germany
- Denomination: Catholic
- Previous denomination: Lutheran (1542-1970)
- Website: www.moritzkirche-halle.de

History
- Status: church
- Dedication: St. Maurice
- Consecrated: 1411

Architecture
- Functional status: active
- Architects: Conrad von Einbeck; Hans Brochstete; Nickel Hoffmann
- Architectural type: Hall church
- Style: late-Gothic
- Groundbreaking: 1388
- Completed: 1557

St. Moritz, also St. Mauritius, is a church in Halle (Saale), Saxony-Anhalt, Germany, dedicated to St. Maurice. The late-Gothic hall church was built as an Augustine Stiftskirche from 1388. It features late-Gothic stone sculptures and a notable organ from 1925.

== Building history ==
The church was built on the site of an earlier Romanesque church from 1388, dedicated to St. Maurice. The eastern part was built first, while the earlier church was still in place. The first builder was Conrad von Einbeck, followed by Hans Brochstete, Nickel Hoffmann and others. The church was consecrated in 1411. The design planned a steeple in the west which was never built. The interior was completed by 1557.

The early eastern part features a rich style with decorative stone sculptures. The 15th-century western part is more modest in style, possibly due to less financial support by the sponsors, the Augustines and the Pfännerschaft gilde. The church was restored several times, 1838 to 1841, 1910 to 1916, 1956 to 1958, and 1972 to 1978). The building is in critical condition, needing restoration.

== Parish history ==
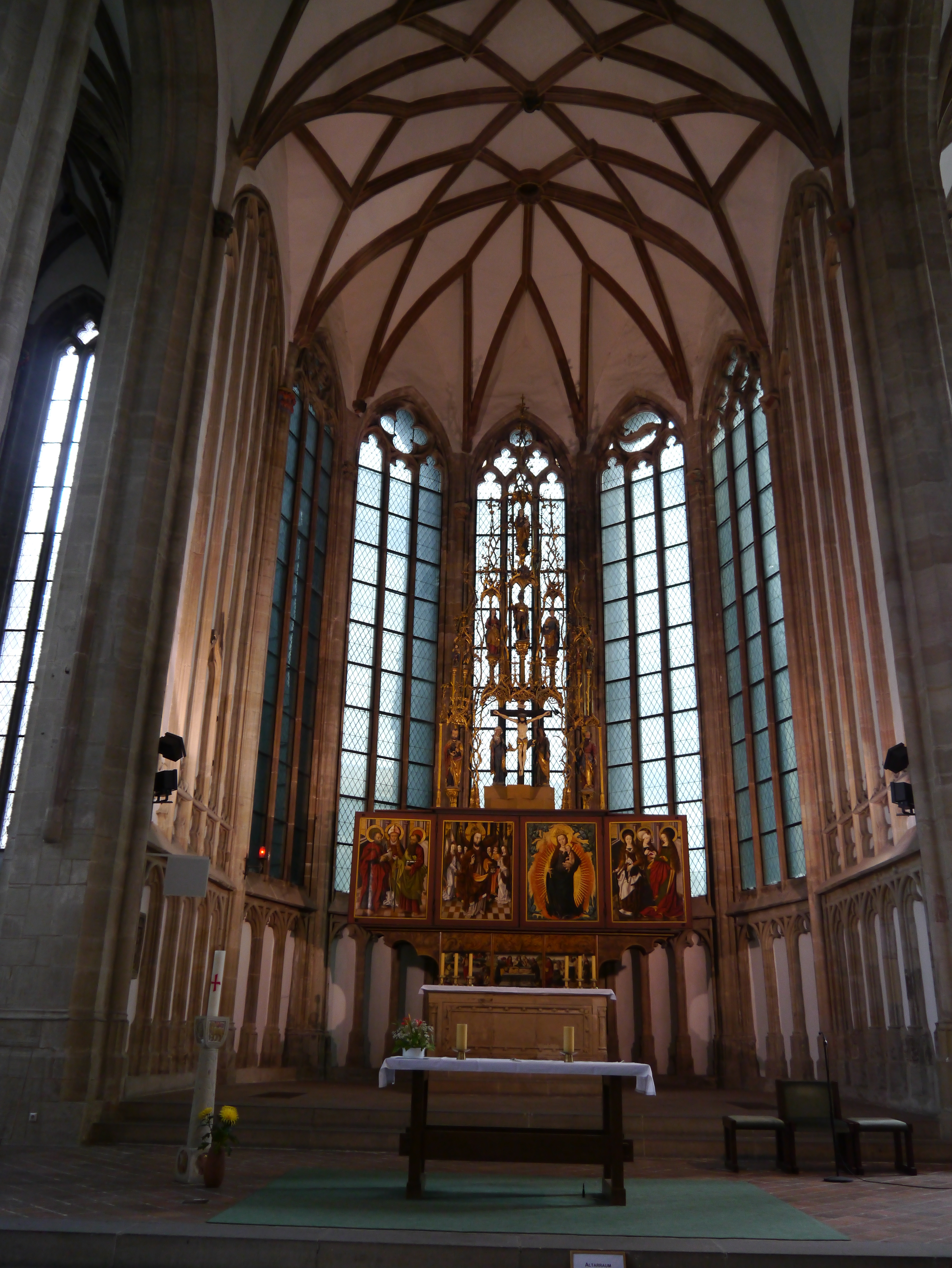
Interior in 2012

The Augustine foundation was dissolved in 1519, and the church used by Dominicans as an abbey church, until it became Lutheran in the Reformation in 1542. In 1970, the church was returned to the Catholic Church.

== Furnishing ==
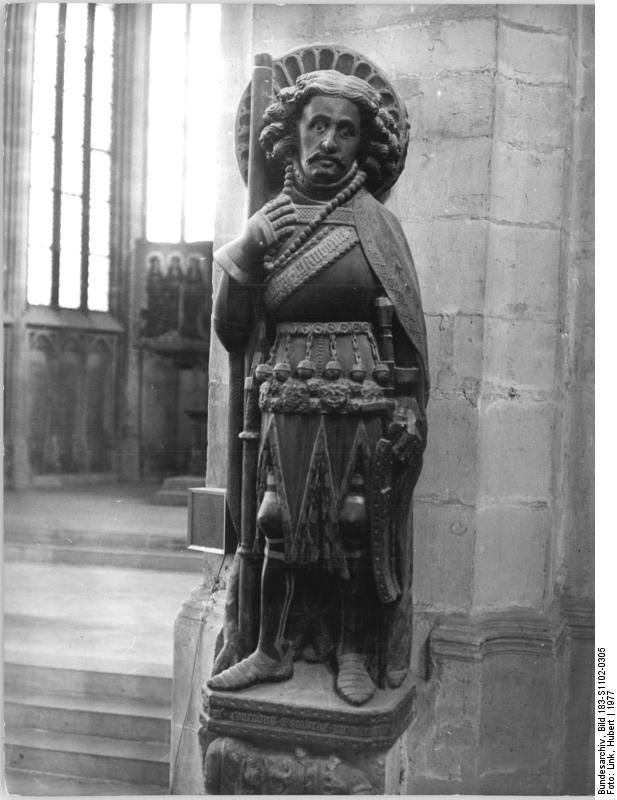
Statue Schellenmoritz

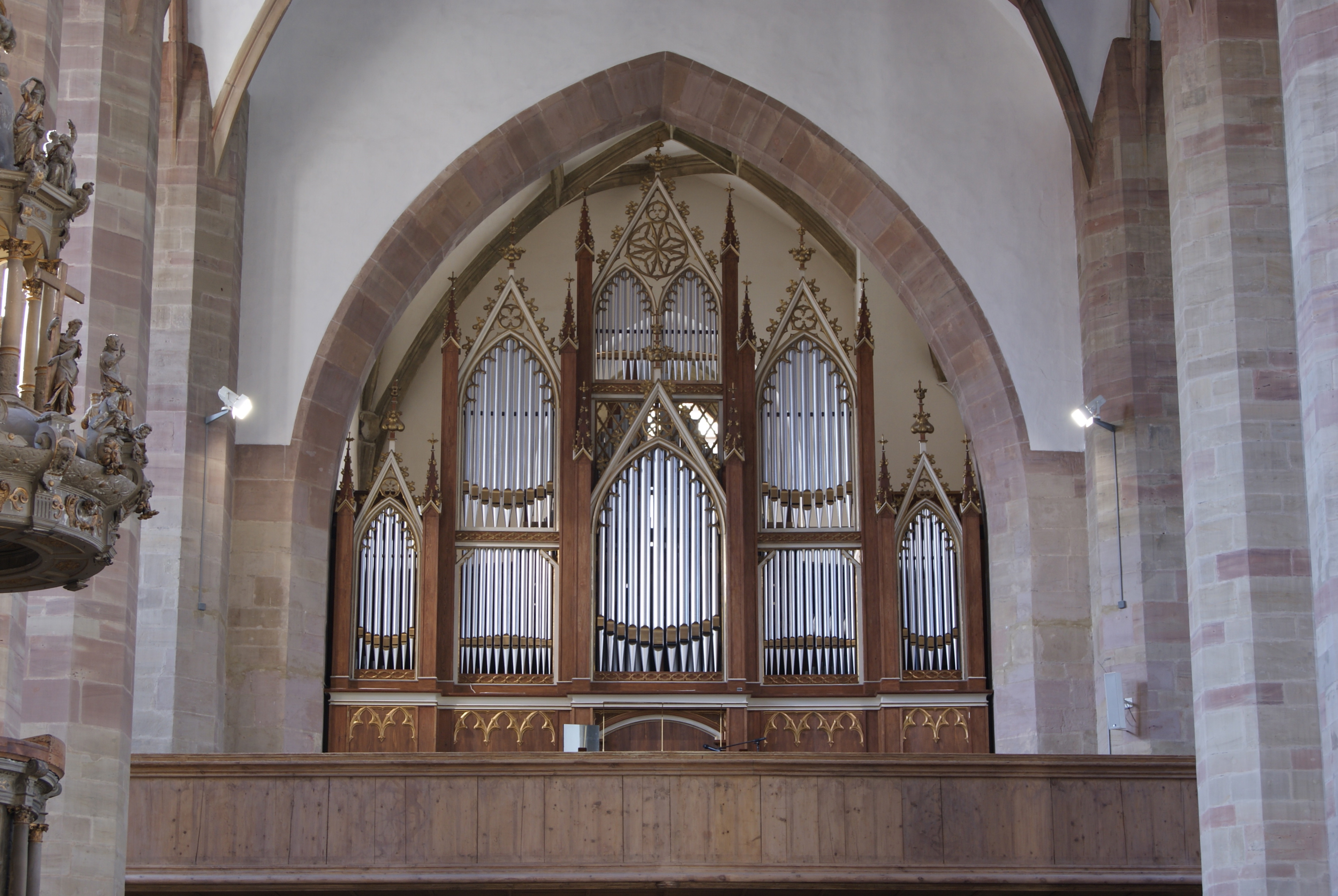
The Sauer organ of 1925

The church features notable art works, including stone sculptures by Conrad von Einbeck, who rendered the church's patron saint as Schellenmoritz (Bell Maurice) in 1411. He created Schmerzensmann (Man of Sorrows) in 1416, Klagende Maria (Mourning Mary) in 1419, Christus an der Geißelsäule (Christ at the Column) in 1419, and a bust which is possibly a self-portrait, but more likely the portrait of one of the donors. The late-Gothic high altar dates from 1511. The Renaissance pulpit was created by Master Zacharias Bogenkrantz in 1592, with a Schalldeckel added by Valentin Silbermann in 1604. The present organ was built by Sauer Orgelbau in 1925 and inaugurated by Thomaskantor Günther Ramin.

== Literature ==
- Wulf Schadendorf: Die Moritzkirche zu Halle. Berlin: Union 1959 (Das christliche Denkmal 43), 2nd ed. 1965
- Achim Todenhöfer: Steinernes Gotteslob. Die mittelalterlichen Kirchen der Stadt Halle. In: Geschichte der Stadt Halle, vol. 1, Halle im Mittelalter und der Frühen Neuzeit. Mitteldeutscher Verlag, Halle 2006, pp 207–226, ISBN 978-3-89812-512-3.
- Michael Pantenius (1995), Stadtführer Halle (in German), Bindlach: Gondrom Verlag, ISBN 3-8112-0816-0
- Brülls/Dietzsch (2000), Architekturführer Halle an der Saale (in German), Berlin: Dietrich Reimer Verlag, ISBN 3-496-01202-1
