= Gerhard Wohlgemuth =

Gerhard Wohlgemuth (16 March 1920 in Frankfurt – 26 October 2001 in Halle (Saale)) was a German composer and literary editor. He wrote several film scores.

== Film scores ==
- Der kleine Kuno (1959)
- Doctor Ahrendt's Decision (1959)
- Mord an Rathenau (1961)
- The Adventures of Werner Holt (1964)
- Die Ohrfeige (1966/67)
- Rotkäppchen (1962)
- Rüpel (1963)
- Das Tal der sieben Monde (1967)
- Turlis Abenteuer (1967)
- Die Toten bleiben jung (1968)
- Die große Reise der Agathe Schweigert (1971/72)
- Mann gegen Mann (1976)
