= Halle (Saale) =

City in Saxony-Anhalt, Germany

- City
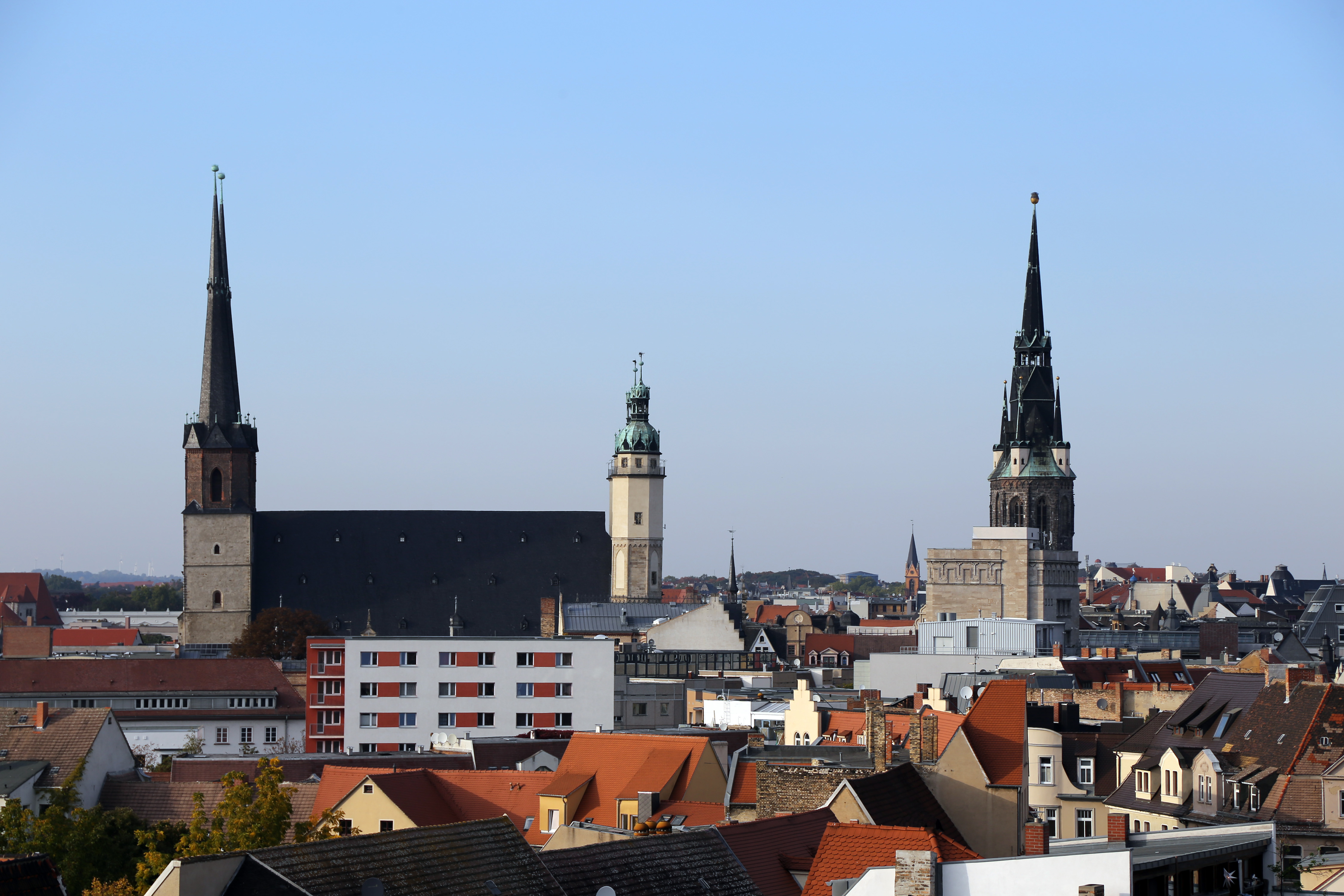
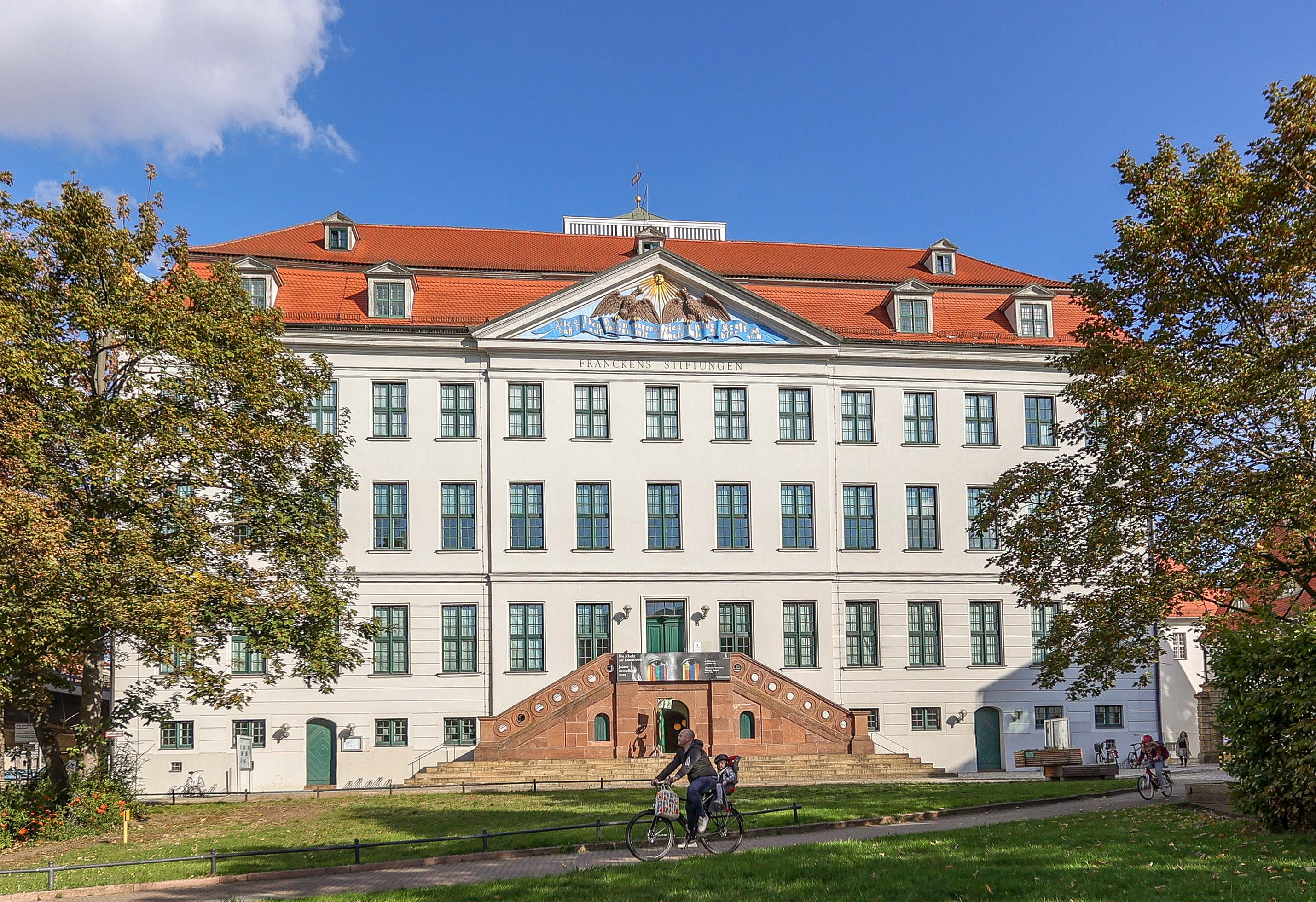
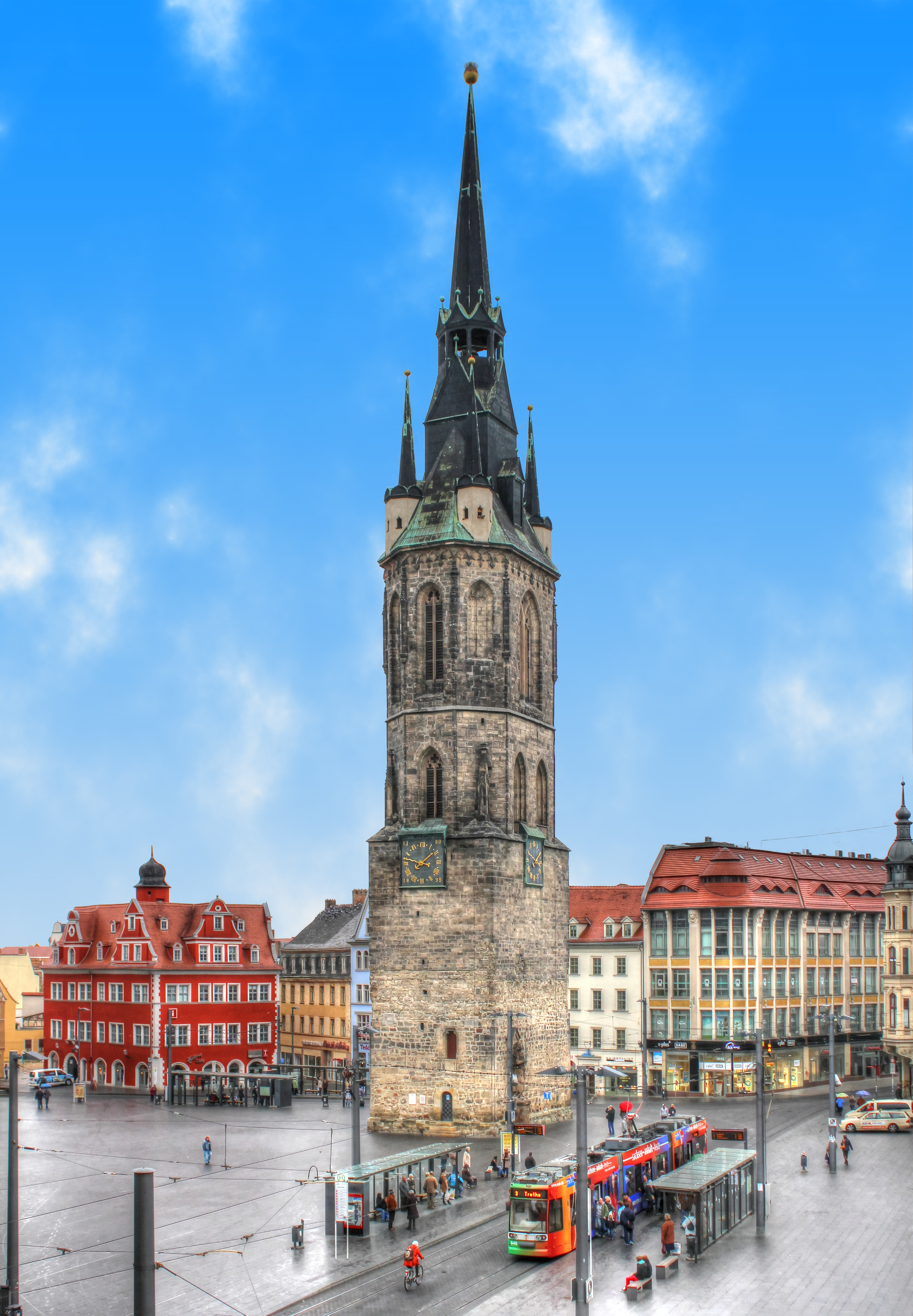
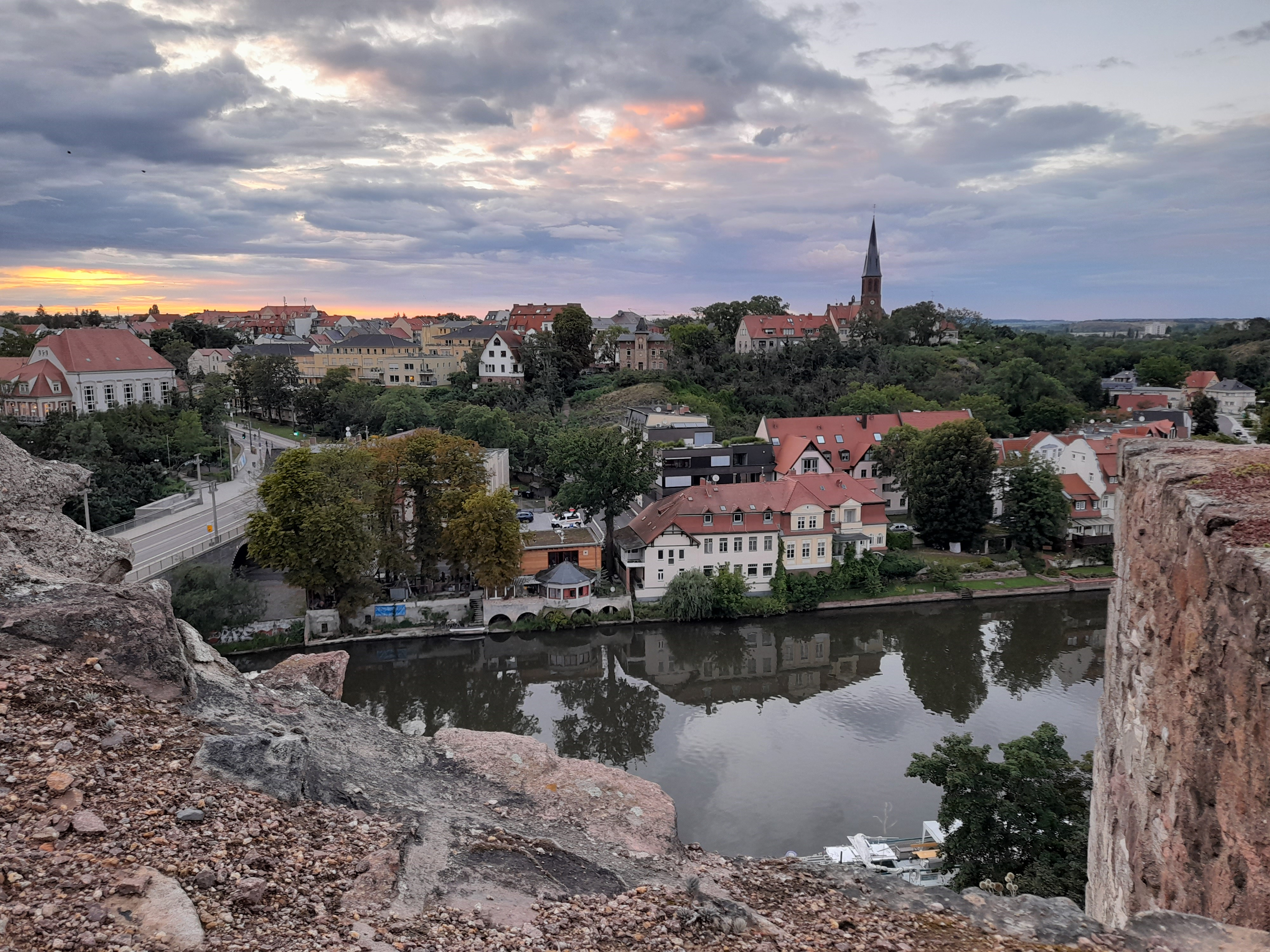
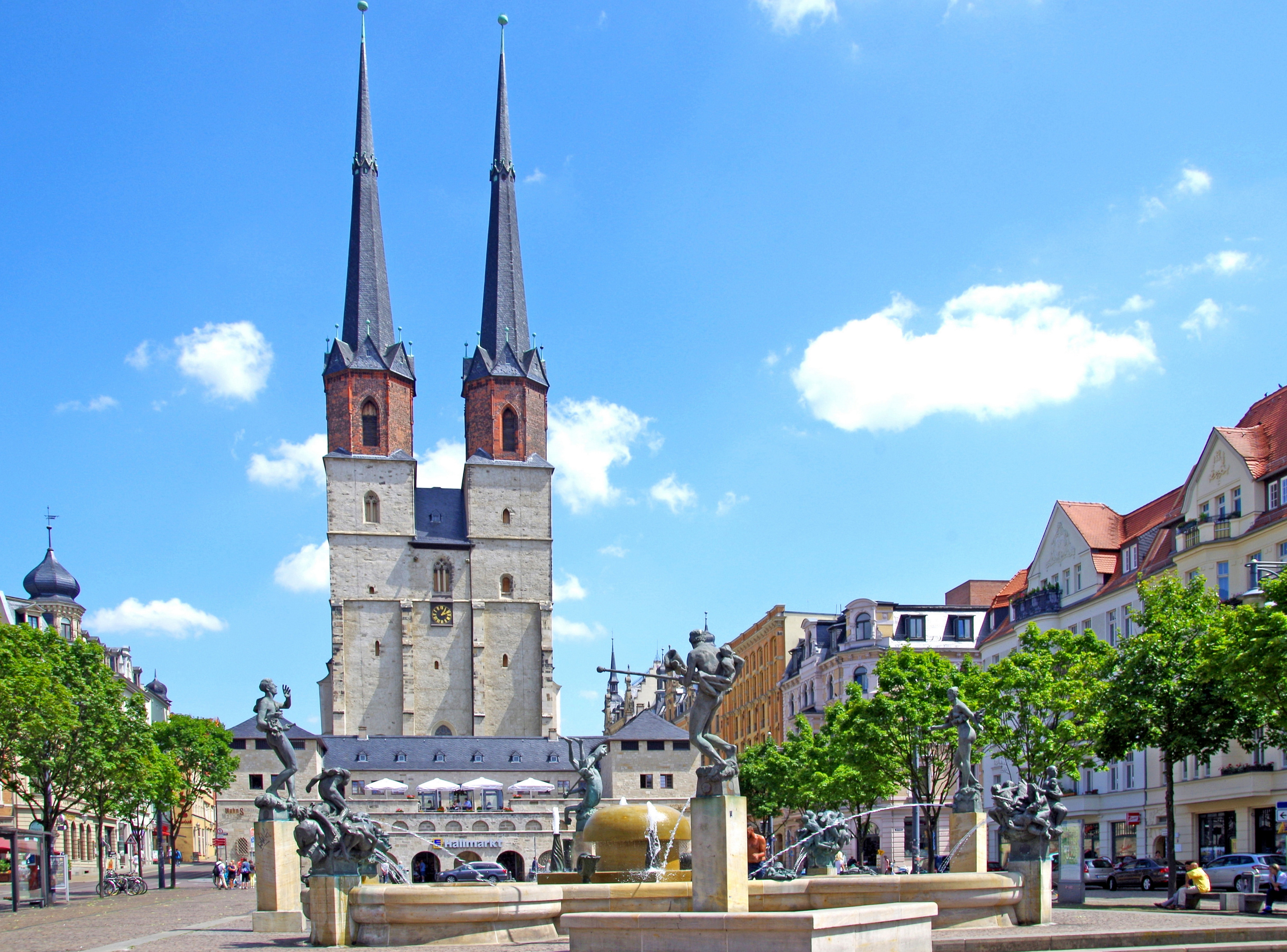
- View of Halle Francke Foundations Roter Turm View across the Saale to Kröllwitz Marktkirche

- Flag Coat of arms
- Interactive map of Halle (Saale)
- Location within Germany Location within Saxony-Anhalt
- Coordinates: 51°28′58″N 11°58′11″E
- Country: Germany
- State: Saxony-Anhalt
- District: Urban district

Government
  - Mayor (2025–32): Alexander Vogt

Area
  - Total: 135.01 km^{2} (52.13 sq mi)
- Elevation: 87 m (285 ft)

Population (2025-12-31)
  - Total: 226,186
  - Density: 1,675.3/km^{2} (4,339.1/sq mi)
- Time zone: UTC+01:00 (CET)
  - Summer (DST): UTC+02:00 (CEST)
- Postal codes: 06108-06132
- Dialling codes: 0049345
- Vehicle registration: HAL
- Website: halle.de

Halle (Saale), or simply Halle (German: [ˈhalə]), is the second largest city of the German state of Saxony-Anhalt. It is the sixth-most populous city in the area of former East Germany after (East) Berlin, Leipzig, Dresden, Chemnitz, and Magdeburg, and is Germany's 31st-largest city.

With around 226,000 inhabitants, Halle is less populous than the state capital, Magdeburg. With Leipzig, Saxony's second largest city, Halle forms the polycentric Leipzig-Halle conurbation. Leipzig/Halle International Airport lies between the two cities, in Schkeuditz. The Leipzig-Halle conurbation is at the heart of the larger Central German Metropolitan Region.

Halle has been known by many names during its history. From the 15th to the 17th century it was called Hall in Sachsen. From then until the beginning of the 20th century, the name Halle an der Saale [ˈhalə ʔan deːɐ̯ ˈzaːlə] was used, and it remains a more formal term for the city. From 1965 to 1995, the city was called Halle/Saale.

Halle lies in the south of Saxony-Anhalt, in the Leipzig Bay, the southernmost part of the North German Plain, and is the largest city on the River Saale (a tributary of the Elbe), which is the third-longest river entirely in Germany, after the Weser and the Main. The White Elster flows into the Saale in the southern borough of Silberhöhe. Halle is the fourth-largest city in the Thuringian-Upper Saxon dialect area, after Leipzig, Dresden, and Chemnitz.

Halle is one of the main economic and educational centers of Central Germany. The Martin Luther University of Halle-Wittenberg, with campuses in Halle and Wittenberg, is Saxony-Anhalt's largest university and one of Germany's oldest. The university hospital of Halle (Universitätsklinikum Halle (Saale)) is the largest hospital in the state. The German National Academy of Sciences (Leopoldina) has its seat in Halle. Halle is an important radio hub; Halle Radio Tower is Germany's second-tallest lattice tower, and at night many public German radio stations switch to the broadcasting center of Mitteldeutscher Rundfunk in Halle, which is responsible for the night program.

The Halle tramway is one of the most extensive German tramway networks, and Halle (Saale) Hauptbahnhof is the second-most important hub of the S-Bahn Mitteldeutschland rapid transit network, after Leipzig Hauptbahnhof. The Saale-Elster Viaduct, Germany's longest bridge and Europe's longest high-speed rail bridge, which is part of the Erfurt–Leipzig/Halle high-speed railway, runs through the southern borough of Planena.

The Nebra sky disc that was discovered in Nebra in the Unstrut valley between Halle and Erfurt is exhibited in the Halle State Museum of Prehistory. The city is the birthplace of German-British Baroque composer George Frideric Handel. The Handel House has been converted into a museum. The Handel Monument in Halle is Germany's only monument to him.

== History ==
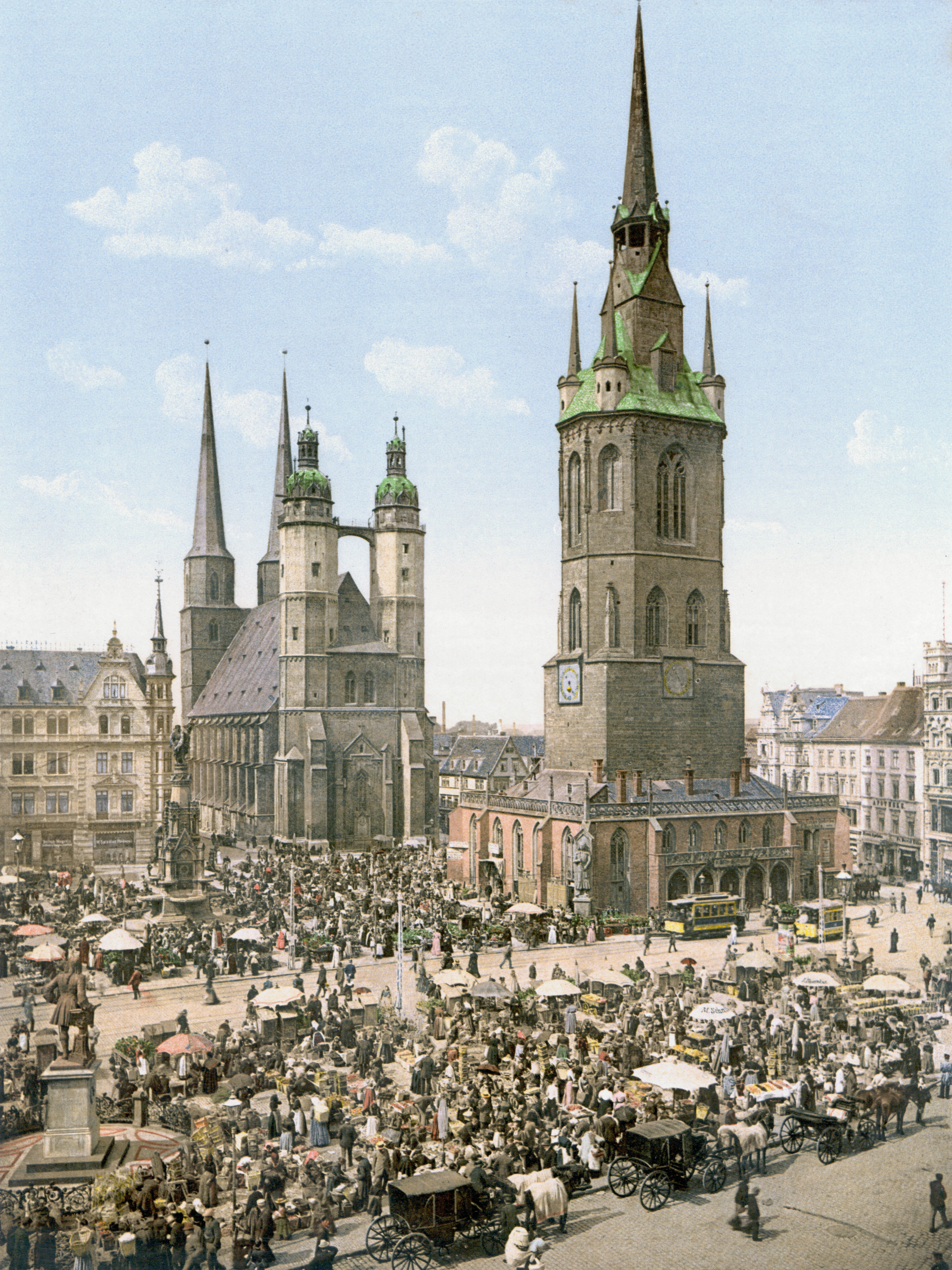
Halle about 1900

=== Name ===
Halle's early history is connected with the harvesting of salt. The name of the river Saale contains the Germanic root for salt, and salt-harvesting has taken place in Halle since at least the Bronze Age (2300–600 BC).

From 1965 to 1995, the official name was Halle/Saale.

=== Middle Ages until industrialisation ===
The earliest documented mention of Halle dates from AD 806. It became a part of the Archbishopric of Magdeburg in the 10th century and remained so until 1680, when the Margraviate of Brandenburg annexed it together with Magdeburg as the Duchy of Magdeburg, while it was an important location for Martin Luther's Reformation in the 16th century. Cardinal Albert of Mainz (Archbishop of Magdeburg from 1513 to 1545) also impacted on the town in this period. According to historic documents, the city of Halle became a member of the Hanseatic League at least as early as 1281.

Halle became a center for Pietism, a movement encouraged by King Frederick William I of Prussia (reigned 1713–1740) because it caused the area's large Lutheran population to be more inclined to Fredrick William I's religion (Calvinism), as well as more loyal to the Prussian king instead of to the decentralized feudal system. By the 1740s Halle had established many orphanages as well as schools for the wealthy in the sober style Pietism encouraged. This Halle education was the first time the "modern education" system was established. The Halle Pietists also combatted poverty.

During the War of the Fourth Coalition, French and Prussian forces clashed in the Battle of Halle on 17 October 1806. The fighting moved from the covered bridges on the city's west side, through the streets and market place, to the eastern suburbs.

In 1815 Halle became part of the Prussian Province of Saxony.

=== World War II (1939–1945) ===
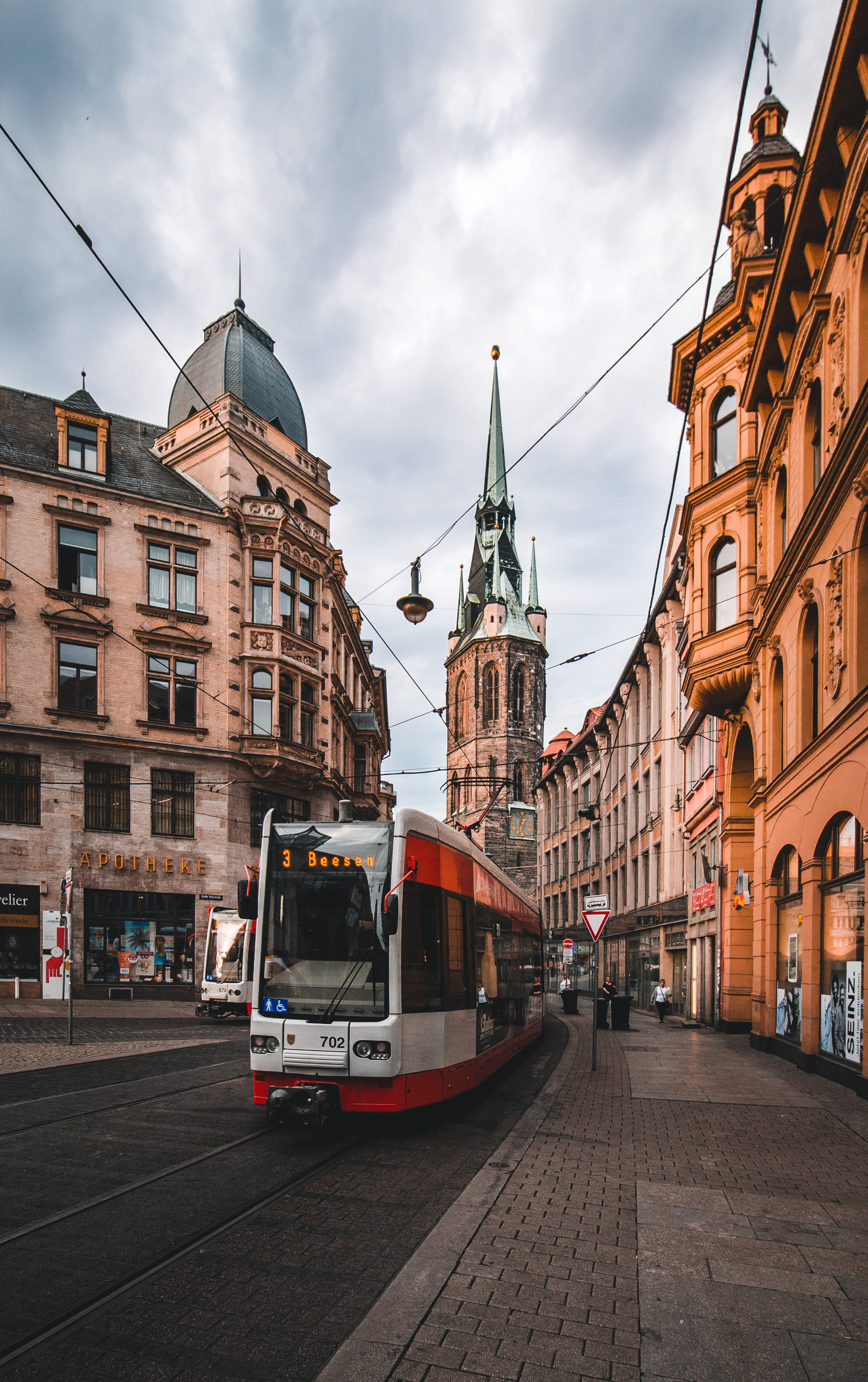
Halle survived the Second World War almost unscathed and still has an intact cityscape today.

During World War II, KZ-Außenlager Birkhahn, a subcamp of Buchenwald was in Halle, where prisoners from Poland, Czechoslovakia, the Soviet Union, France, Netherlands and other nations were forced to work in the Siebel aircraft plants, making combat aircraft. The plant was later dismantled. In Ammendorf, a large factory owned by Orgacid produced mustard gas.

Near the end of World War II, there were two bombing raids carried out against the town: the first on 31 March 1945, the second a few days later. The first attack took place between the railway station and the city's centre, and the second bombing was in the southern district. It killed over 1,000 inhabitants and destroyed 3,600 buildings. Among them, are the Market Church, St. George Church, the Old Town Hall, the municipal theatre, historic buildings on Bruederstrasse and on Grosse Steinstrasse, and the city cemetery.

On 17 April 1945, American soldiers occupied Halle, and the Red Tower was set on fire by artillery and destroyed. The Market Church and the Church of St. George received more hits. However, the city was spared further damage because an aerial bombardment was canceled, after former naval officer Felix von Luckner negotiated the city's surrender to the American army. In July, the Americans withdrew and the city was occupied by the Red Army.

=== German Democratic Republic (1949–1990) ===
After World War II, Halle served as the capital of the short-lived administrative region of Saxony-Anhalt until 1952, when the East German government abolished its "Länder" (states). As a part of East Germany (until 1990), it functioned as the capital of the administrative district (Bezirk) of Halle.

=== Since German unity (after 1990) ===
When Saxony-Anhalt was re-established as a Bundesland in 1990, Magdeburg, not Halle, became the capital.

On 9 October 2019, two people were killed in a shooting incident at a synagogue in Halle. The Federal Prosecutor (Generalbundesanwalt) classified the attack as an act of right-wing terrorism stemming from antisemitism; as a consequence security measures at Jewish facilities were increased.

== Geography ==
Halle (Saale) is in the southern part of Saxony-Anhalt in central Germany, along the river Saale, which drains the surrounding plains and the greater part of the neighboring Free State of Thuringia just to its south, and the Thuringian basin, north of the Thuringian Forest. Leipzig, one of Germany's major cities, is 35 kilometres (22 mi) away. Its area is 135.01 km^{2} (52.13 sq mi).

=== City structure and incorporations ===
The city is divided into five districts ('Stadtbezirke'): Central, North, East, South, and West. The city districts are in turn are divided into neighbourhoods ('Stadtteile'), which are further divided into quarters ('Stadtviertel').

The following municipalities and districts have been incorporated into the city of Halle (Saale) over the years.

- 1817: Glaucha and Neumarkt
- 1891: Gutsbezirk Freiimfelde
- 1900: Giebichenstein, Trotha, Kröllwitz, and Gut Gimritz (on Peißnitz Island)
- 1 July 1950: Town of Ammendorf (with the districts of Beesen, Burg in der Aue, Osendorf, Planena, and Radewell), Bruckdorf, Büschdorf, Diemitz, Dölau, Kanena, Lettin, Mötzlich, Nietleben, Passendorf, Reideburg, Seeben, Tornau, and Wörmlitz-Böllberg
- 12 May 1967: Separation of the Halle-West development area north of Passendorf, which became an independent town under the name Halle-Neustadt, later a district-free city
- 6 May 1990: Reintegration of Halle-Neustadt

=== Nearby towns ===
Halle (Saale) and Leipzig are the two centres of the Central German Metropolitan Region with more than 2.4 million people.

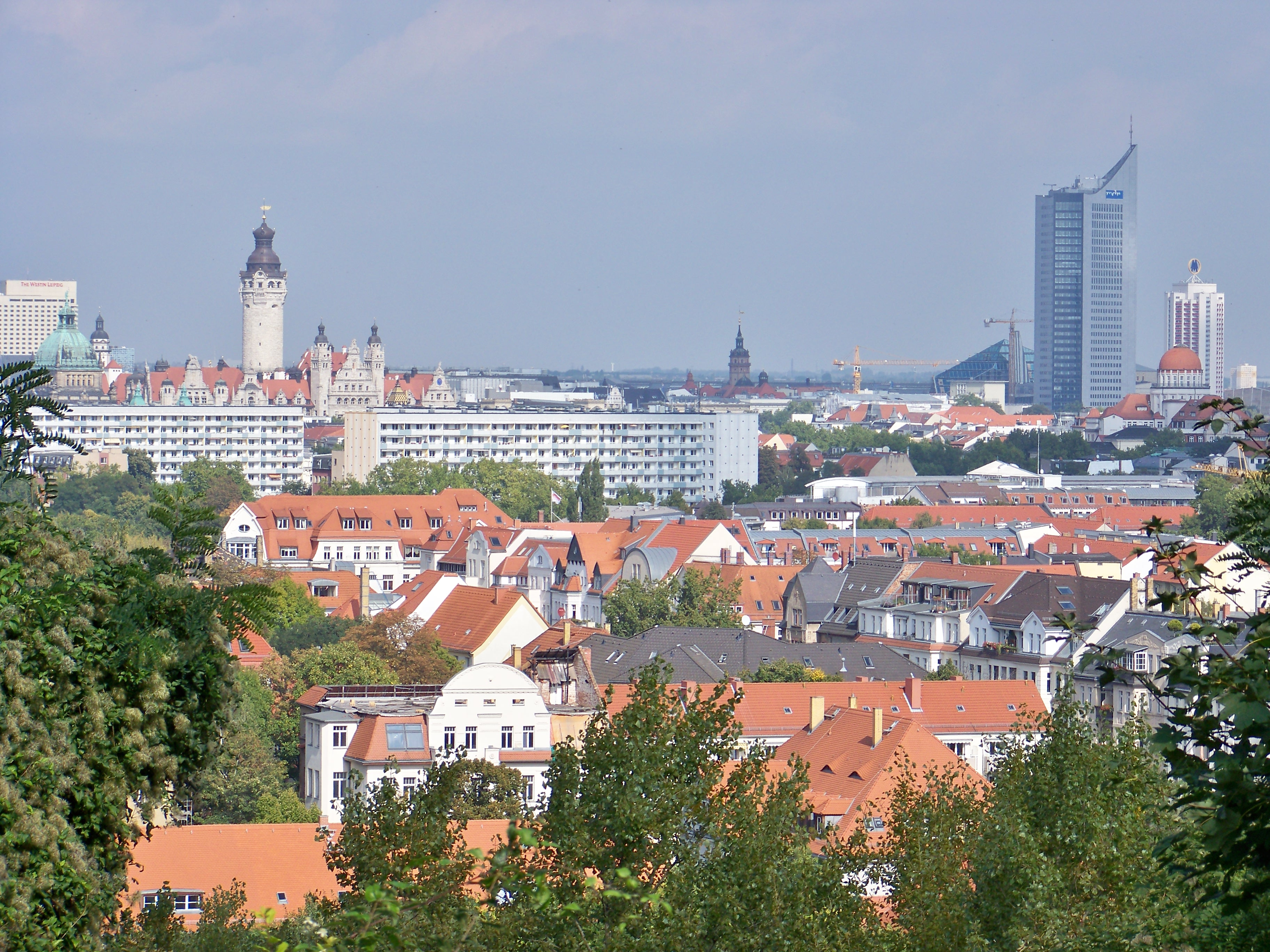
Leipzig, Germany's eighth largest city

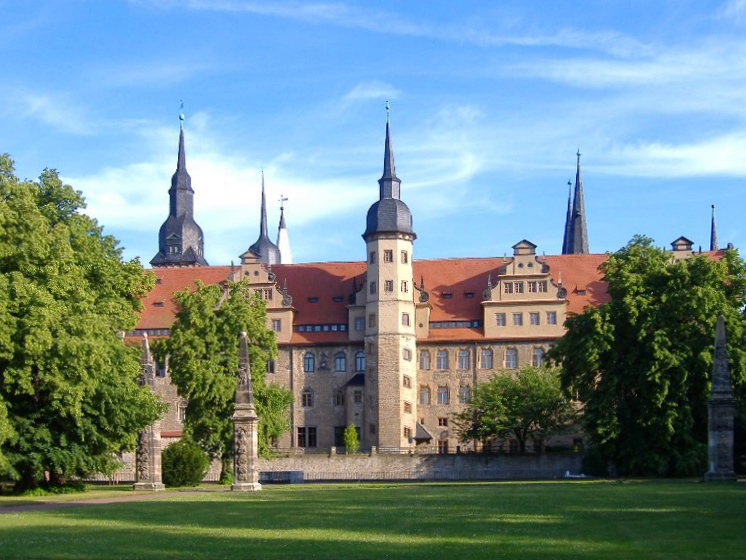
Merseburg borders Halle

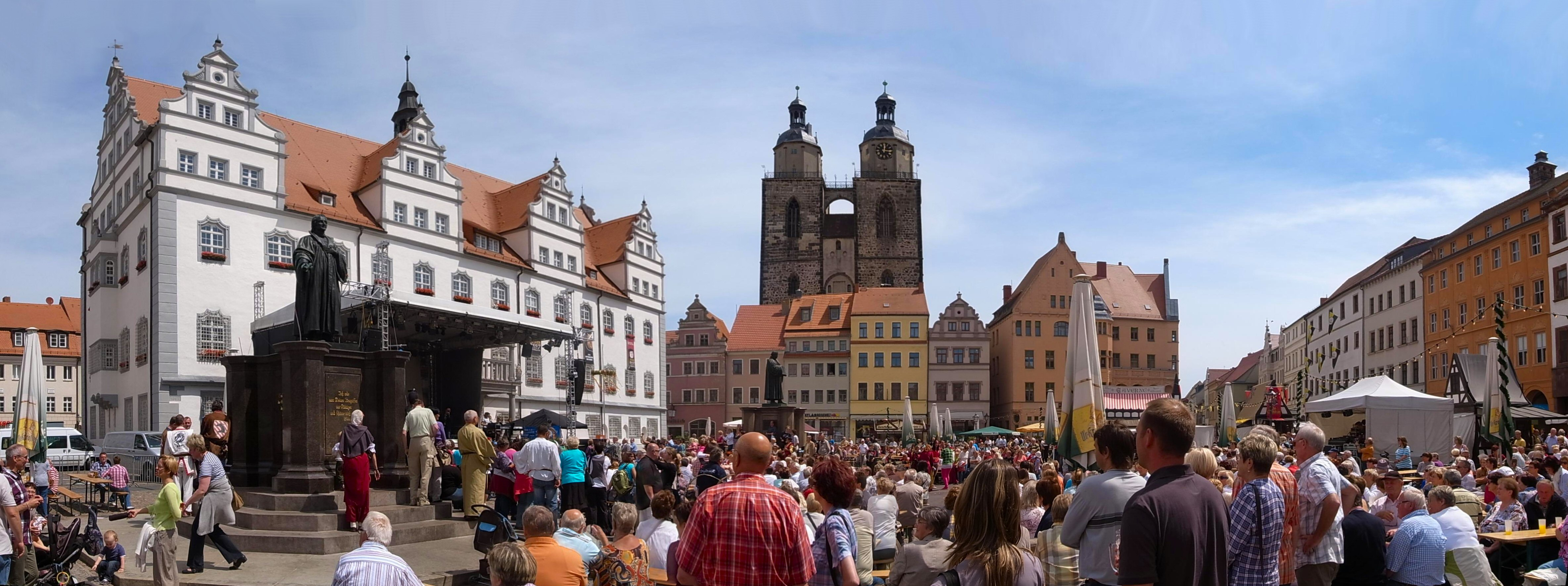
Wittenberg

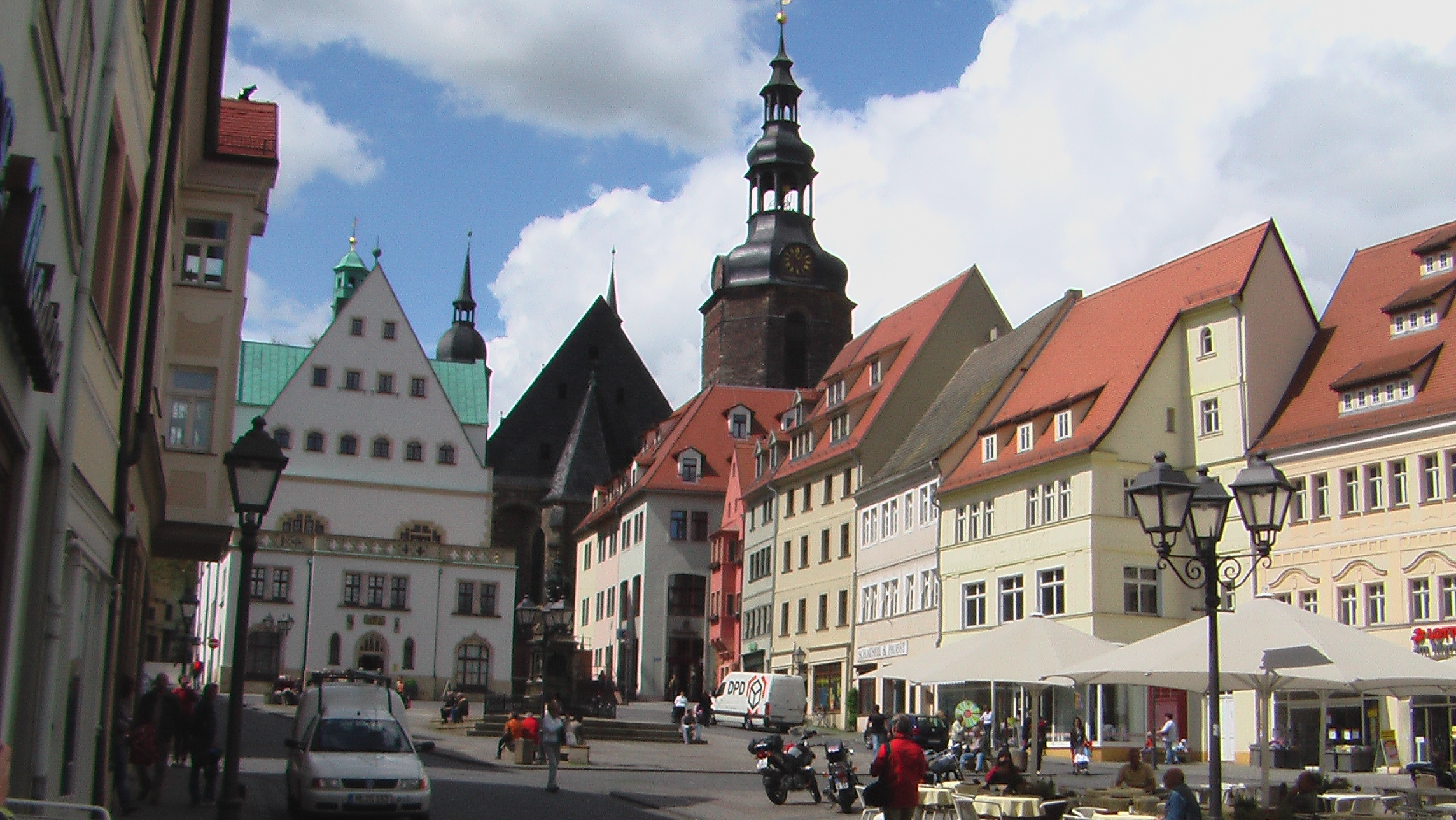
Eisleben

=== Climate ===
Köppen climate classification classifies its climate as oceanic (Cfb). However, it is close to being a cold semi-arid climate (BSk). Using the most current climate data from April 2017 to March 2022, the annual precipitation is 17 mm too much to be classified as a cold semi-arid climate. For example, using the climate data from September 2015 to August 2020, the climate would fulfill the requirements to be classified as a cold semi-arid climate. Notwithstanding, the great variation of annual precipitation between the years allows agriculture and large trees to grow, surviving recurring drought periods and years like in the summers of 2018 and 2019 with severe drought because of regularly occurring wet periods and years and absence of extremely high temperatures - never reaching 40 °C (104 °F). With its vegetation, Halle is far from the steppe or semi-desert vegetation typical of cold semi-arid climates.

Climate data for Halle (Leipzig/Halle Airport) (1991–2020 normals, extremes 1973–2013)
Month	Jan	Feb	Mar	Apr	May	Jun	Jul	Aug	Sep	Oct	Nov	Dec	Year
Record high °C (°F)	15.9 (60.6)	18.6 (65.5)	23.0 (73.4)	29.5 (85.1)	31.9 (89.4)	34.8 (94.6)	36.6 (97.9)	37.2 (99.0)	32.9 (91.2)	28.2 (82.8)	18.7 (65.7)	16.5 (61.7)	37.2 (99.0)
Mean daily maximum °C (°F)	3.6 (38.5)	5.0 (41.0)	9.1 (48.4)	14.7 (58.5)	19.1 (66.4)	22.5 (72.5)	25.0 (77.0)	24.6 (76.3)	19.7 (67.5)	14.1 (57.4)	8.0 (46.4)	4.5 (40.1)	14.2 (57.6)
Daily mean °C (°F)	1.0 (33.8)	1.7 (35.1)	4.9 (40.8)	9.6 (49.3)	13.9 (57.0)	17.3 (63.1)	19.5 (67.1)	19.2 (66.6)	14.8 (58.6)	9.9 (49.8)	5.1 (41.2)	2.0 (35.6)	9.9 (49.8)
Mean daily minimum °C (°F)	−1.8 (28.8)	−1.5 (29.3)	1.0 (33.8)	4.4 (39.9)	8.5 (47.3)	11.9 (53.4)	14.1 (57.4)	14.0 (57.2)	10.2 (50.4)	6.2 (43.2)	2.3 (36.1)	−0.6 (30.9)	5.7 (42.3)
Record low °C (°F)	−27.6 (−17.7)	−21.6 (−6.9)	−16.6 (2.1)	−6.5 (20.3)	−2.6 (27.3)	1.8 (35.2)	5.7 (42.3)	5.5 (41.9)	0.5 (32.9)	−6.7 (19.9)	−12.9 (8.8)	−20.2 (−4.4)	−27.6 (−17.7)
Average precipitation mm (inches)	33.4 (1.31)	24.5 (0.96)	36.5 (1.44)	32.0 (1.26)	51.2 (2.02)	54.4 (2.14)	75.8 (2.98)	63.6 (2.50)	50.5 (1.99)	35.2 (1.39)	40.4 (1.59)	34.3 (1.35)	531.9 (20.94)
Average precipitation days (≥ 1.0 mm)	15.7	12.6	14.2	11.1	12.7	12.7	13.9	13.0	11.8	13.3	14.5	15.3	160.8
Average snowy days (≥ 1.0 cm)	8.1	7.7	3.7	0.6	0	0	0	0	0	0.1	1.4	4.9	26.5
Average relative humidity (%)	82.3	79.0	74.3	67.5	67.8	67.8	66.7	68.1	75.4	80.9	84.5	83.8	74.8
Mean monthly sunshine hours	61.9	81.0	128.5	190.9	231.4	229.9	233.9	219.6	163.9	119.3	64.9	53.3	1,748.8
Source 1: World Meteorological Organization
Source 2: Data derived from Deutscher Wetterdienst, note

== Demographics ==
Historical population
Year	Pop.	±%
1300	4,000	—
1500	7,000	+75.0%
1600	10,000	+42.9%
1800	15,159	+51.6%
1871	52,639	+247.2%
1900	156,609	+197.5%
1919	182,326	+16.4%
1925	194,575	+6.7%
1933	209,169	+7.5%
1939	220,092	+5.2%
1945	212,382	−3.5%
1950	289,119	+36.1%
1964	273,987	−5.2%
1970	257,261	−6.1%
1981	232,622	−9.6%
1990	310,234	+33.4%
2001	243,045	−21.7%
2011	229,153	−5.7%
2022	226,586	−1.1%
Population size may be affected by changes in administrative divisions. Source:

As of 31 December 2025, the population is 226,186, of which 48.3% are males and 51.7% are females. Minors make up 15.7% of the population, and seniors make up 24.5%.

In the East Germany era Halle had a lot of big industry with many workplaces. At the time Halle was one of the leading cities in East Germany, along with Leipzig and Dresden. Halle reached its highest population in 1990 with 310,234 inhabitants. After German reunification Halle's population began to rapidly decline owing to its loss of industry, with many people moving to former West Germany. Halle is now considered one of the poorest cities in Germany.

=== Immigration ===
As of the 2022 census, immigrants make up 13.0% of the population. The 5 largest foreign countries of birth are Syria, Ukraine, Poland, Russia, and the Czech Republic. 25.0% of immigrants were born in other countries of the EU, 24.7% in the rest of Europe, and 50.3% outside of Europe.

Halle's foreign population began to grow in 2015 after refugees from Syria and other war-torn countries moved there.

Foreign population by country of birth (2022 census)
#	Country of birth	Population	#	Country of birth	Population
1	Syria	5,647	11	Iraq	563
2	Ukraine	3,217	12	Kazakhstan	550
3	Poland	2,392	13	Bulgaria	483
4	Russia	1,693	14	Iran	465
5	Czech Republic	1,249	15	Hungary	453
6	Romania	963	16	China	337
7	Turkey	815	17	Kosovo	318
8	Afghanistan	785	18	Nigeria	311
9	Vietnam	666	19	Croatia	283
10	India	599	20	Italy	272

== Politics ==
=== Mayor ===
The mayor of Halle has been independent politician Alexander Vogt since 2025. The most recent mayoral election was held on 2 February 2025, with a runoff held on 23 February, and the results were as follows:

Candidate	Party	First round		Second round	
Candidate	Party	Votes	%	Votes	%
Alexander Vogt	Independent	16,706	19.1	60,758	51.8
Egbert Geier	SPD	32,418	37.1	56,465	48.2
Kerstin Godenrath	CDU	13,588	15.5		
Andreas Wels	Independent	9,989	11.4		
Sven Macha	Independent	6,531	7.5		
Dörte Jacobi	Independent (PARTEI)	3,065	3.5		
Maik Weiderpas	Independent	2,576	2.9		
Wolfgang Hoppe	Independent	1,477	1.7		
Martin Bochmann	Independent (PARTEI)	1.087	1.2		
Valid votes		87,437	99.4	117,223	98.4
Invalid votes		553	0.6	1,924	1.6
Total		87,990	100.0	119,147	100.0
Electorate/voter turnout		185,645	47.4	185,209	64.3
Source: https://wahlergebnisse.halle.de/OBW2025/ City of Halle (Saale)]

=== City council ===
The most recent city council election was held on 9 June 2024, and the results were as follows:

Party	Votes	%	+/-	Seats	+/-
Alternative for Germany (AfD)	69,813	21.2	▲7.2	12	▲4
Christian Democratic Union (CDU)	67,804	20.6	▲3.2	11	▲1
The Left (Die Linke)	40,831	12.4	▼5.4	7	▼3
Social Democratic Party (SPD)	39,081	11.9	▲0.6	7	▲1
Alliance 90/The Greens (Grüne)	37,541	11.4	▼4.9	6	▼3
Priority Halle (Hauptsache)	18,032	5.5	▼1.4	3	▼1
With Citizens for Halle (MitBürger)	13,627	4.1	▼0.3	2	▼1
Free Democratic Party (FDP)	11,852	3.6	▼1.8	2	▼1
Die PARTEI (PARTEI)	10,781	3.3	▼0.1	2	0
Volt Germany (Volt)	8,999	2.7	New	2	New
Free Voters (FW)	6,011	1.8	▼0.3	1	0
dieBasis	3,569	1.1	New	1	New
Schrader (Independent)	1,592	0.5	New	0	New
Valid votes	329,535	100.0			
Invalid ballots	1,799	1.6			
Total ballots	113,268	100.0		56	±0
Electorate/voter turnout	186,061	60.9	▲4.3		
Source: City of Halle (Saale)

== Sights ==
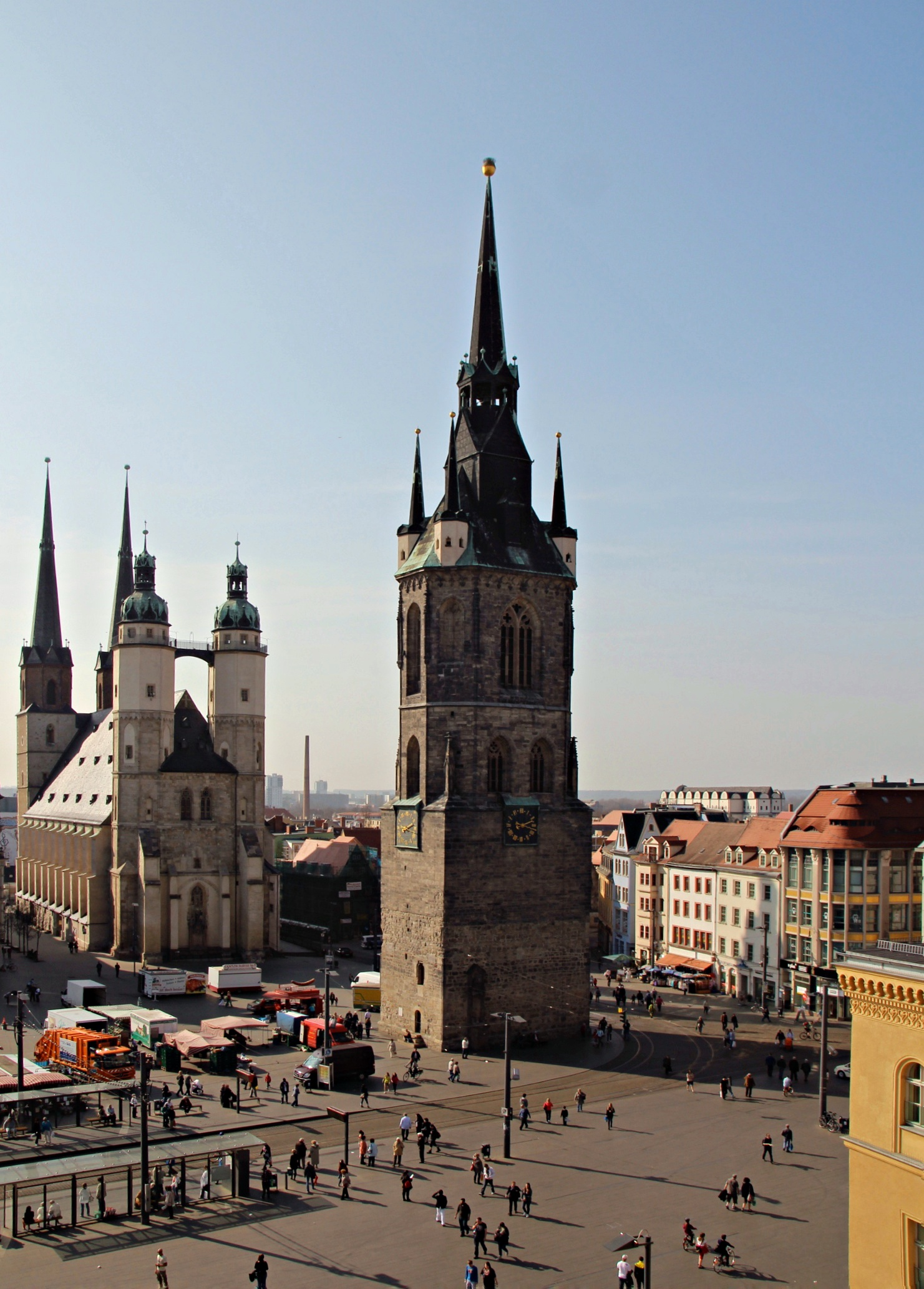
Halle market square, with Market Church

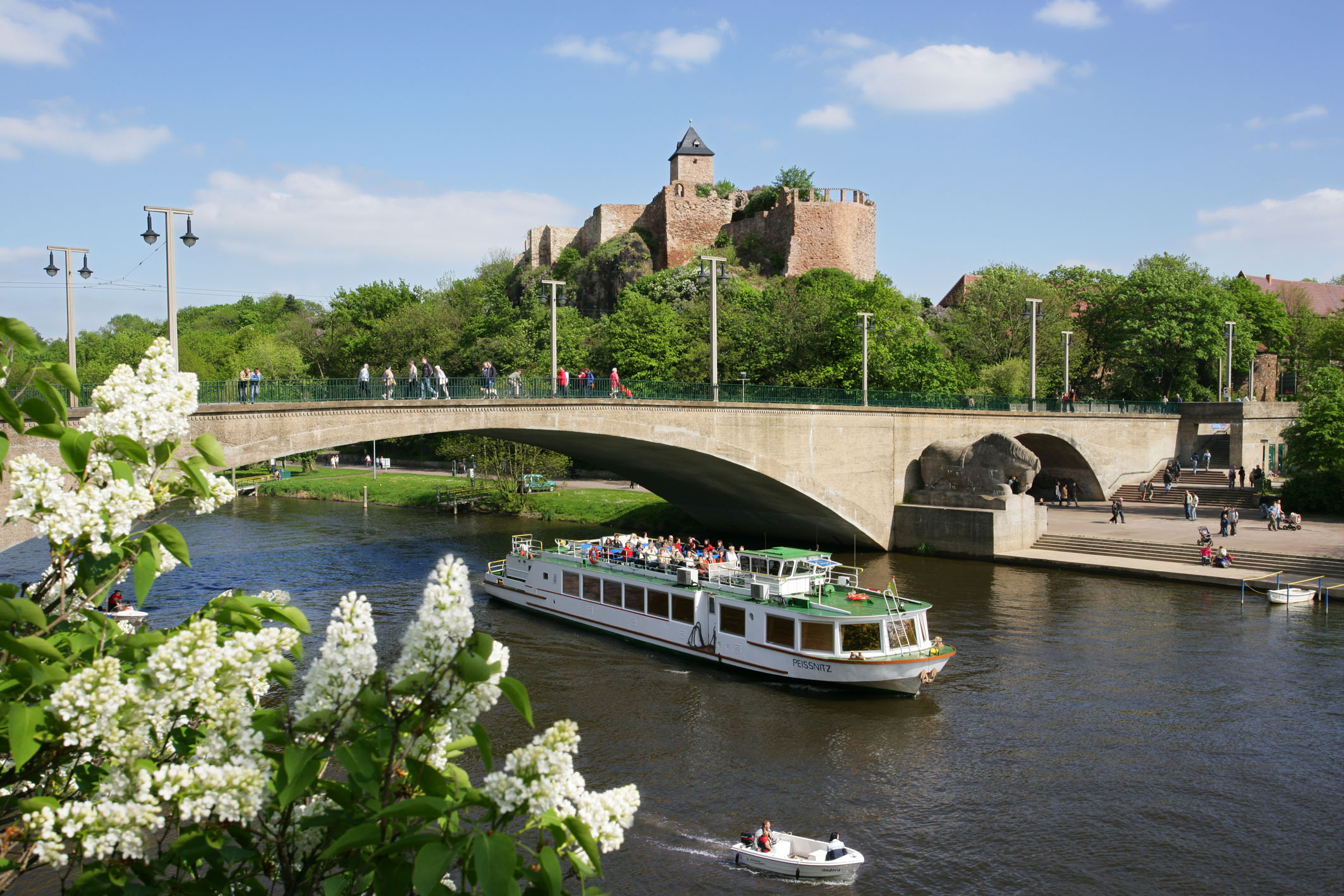
View to Giebichenstein Castle

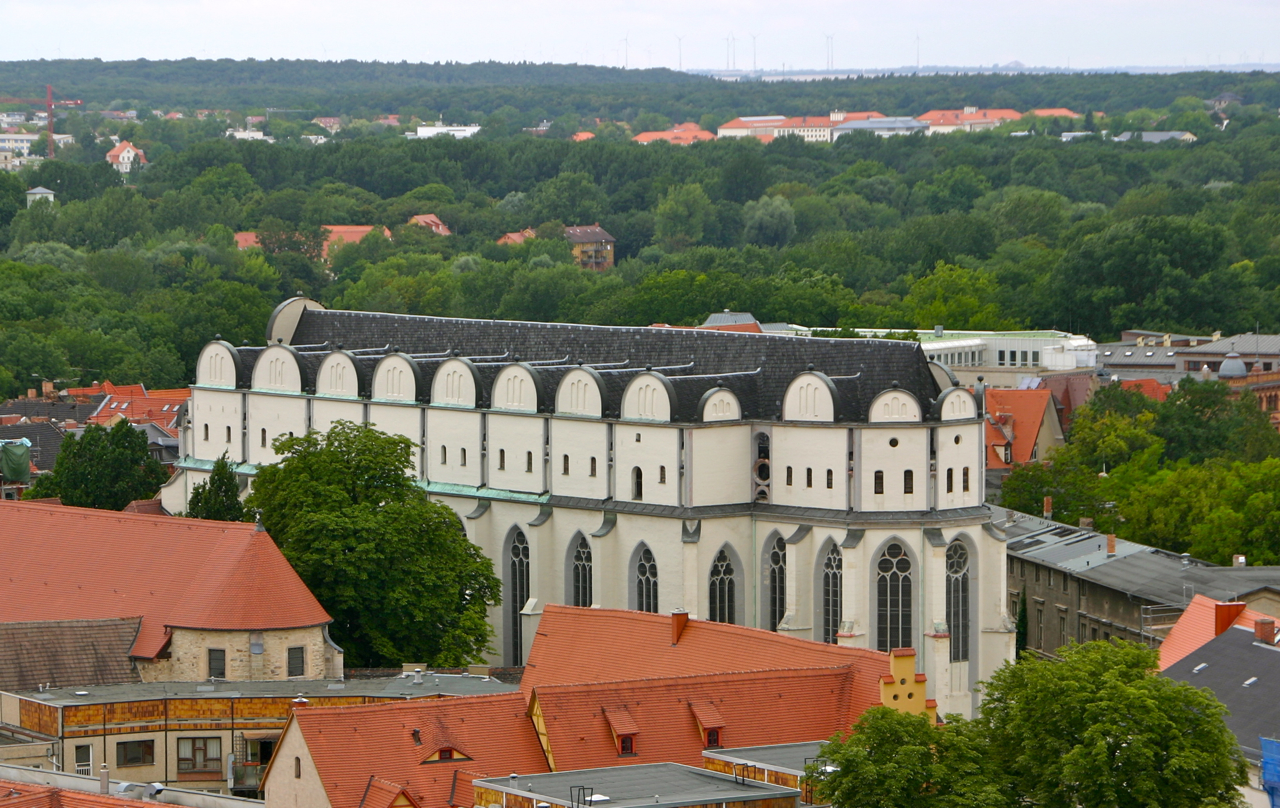
Halle Cathedral

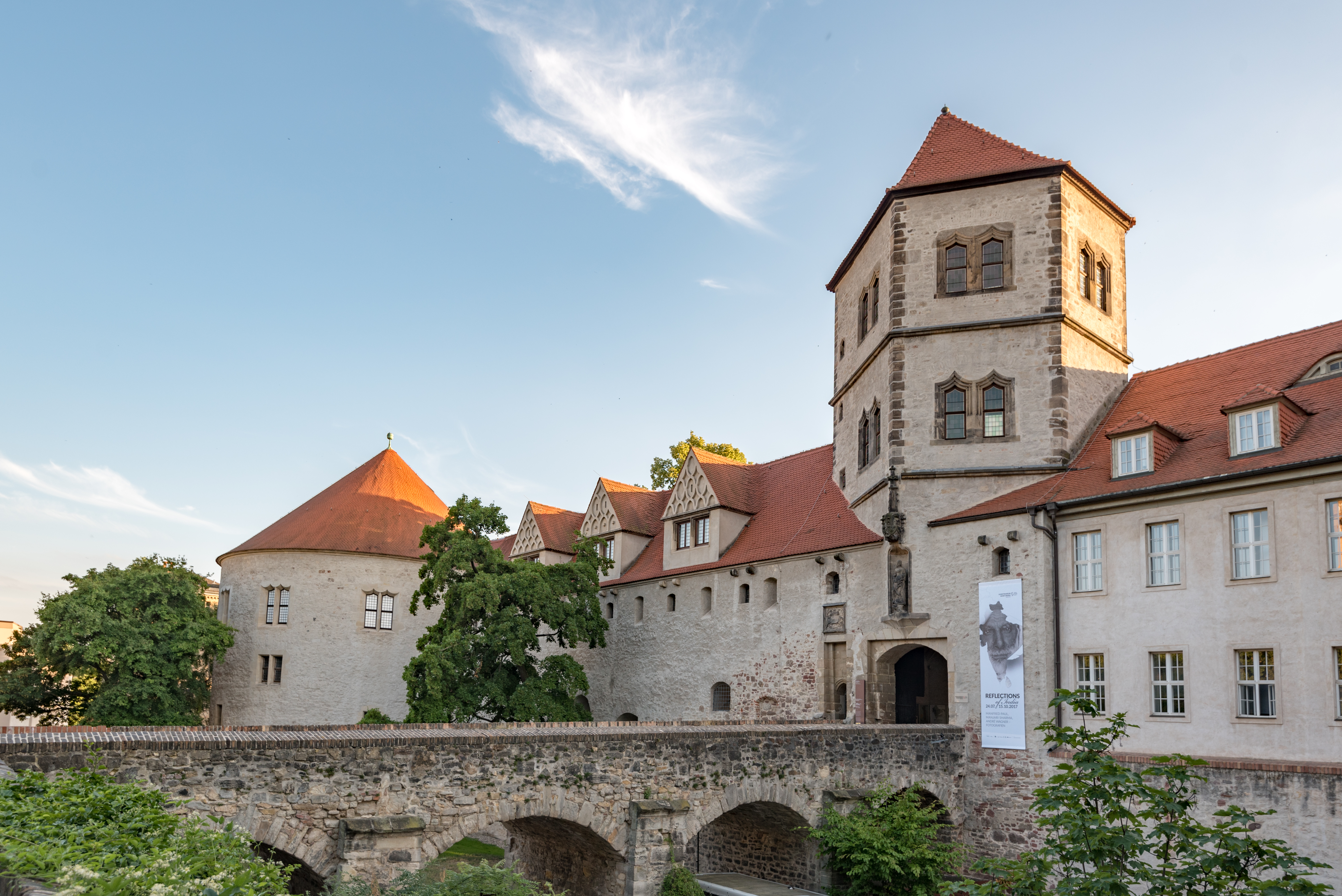
Moritzburg Castle

- Halloren Chocolate Factory and visitors' centre, Germany's oldest chocolate factory still in use.
- Giebichenstein Castle, first mentioned in 961, is north of the city centre on a hill above the Saale river, with a museum in the upper castle and the Burg Giebichenstein University of Art and Design in the lower castle.
- Moritzburg, a newer castle, was built between 1484 and 1503. It was the residence of the Archbishops of Magdeburg, was destroyed in the Thirty Years' War, and was a ruin for centuries afterward. Partially reconstructed in 1901–1913, it houses the Kunstmuseum Moritzburg Halle (Saale). The reconstruction was completed with the opening of new exhibition rooms designed by the Spanish architects Sobejano and Nieto in 2010.
- Neue Residenz (New Residence), an early Renaissance palace (1531–1537)
- Market square with
  - Market Church of St Mary (Marktkirche), built in 1529–1554, using elements of two medieval churches, St Gertrude's Church dating back to the 11th century and the older St Mary's Church from the 12th century. The church has four steeples, the two western octagonal ones are called Blue Towers because of their dark blue slate roofing. The other two Hausmannstürme are connected by a bridge and on this bridge was the city's fire watch. The church owns the original death-mask of Martin Luther. The Marktkirche's four towers are a landmark symbol of the city.
  - Roter Turm (Red Tower), originally built as campanile of the older St Mary's Church between 1418 and 1503, a landmark of Halle, with the steeples of St Mary's Church, forms the five towers marking the city's skyline.
  - Roland, originally (13th century) a wooden sculpture representing urban liberty. (After an uprising in the city a cage was placed around it between 1481 and 1513, a reminder of the restrictions.) Today's sculpture is a sandstone replica made in 1719.
  - Marktschlösschen, late Renaissance building, gallery and tourist information office
  - Monument to George Frideric Handel, 1859 by Hermann Heidel
  - Ratshof (Council's Yard), built in 1928/29 as a backyard building of the Old Town Hall (demolished in 1948/50 after the destruction of World War II, so the Ratshof is today in the market place).
  - Stadthaus, Renaissance-Revival building of 1891–1894
  - Yellow line, which runs over the market square, marking a geological fault line, the Hallische Verwerfung.
- Handel House, first mentioned in 1558, birthplace of George Frideric Handel, a museum since 1948
- Wilhelm Friedemann Bach House, home of composer Wilhelm Friedemann Bach, now a museum
- Old Market square with Donkey's Fountain (1906/13), referring to a local legend
- Remains of the town fortifications: the Leipzig Tower (Leipziger Turm) (15th century) in the east and remains of the town wall to the south of the city centre.
- Sculpture dedicated to Lenin in the Pestalozzi Park.
- Francke Foundations, Baroque buildings (including Europe's largest surviving half-timbered building) and historical collections
- Stadtgottesacker, a Renaissance cemetery, laid out in 1557, in the style of an Italian camposanto
- Saline Museum is dedicated to Halle's salt-works and the corporation of salt workers (Halloren)
- Cathedral (Dom), a steepleless building, was originally a church within a Dominican monastery (1271), converted into a cathedral by cardinal Albert of Hohenzollern. Since 1688 it has been the church of the Reformed parish.
- Saint Maurice Church, late Gothic building (1388–1511)
- Saint Ulrich Church, late Gothic church of the Servite Order (15th century), today used as a concert hall
- Church of the former village of Böllberg (Romanesque, with late Gothic painted wooden ceiling)
- Numerous bourgeois town houses, including the Ackerbürgerhof (15th – 18th centuries with remains from the 12th century), Christian Wolff's House (today City Museum), Graseweg House (half-timbered building)
- State Museum of Prehistory where the Nebra sky disk is exhibited
- Volkspark (1906/07), former meeting house of the Social Democrats
- Theatres:
  - Halle Opera House
  - Neues Theater
  - Puppentheather
  - Thalia Theater, the only theatre for children in Saxony-Anhalt
  - Steintor Bühne
- Parks and gardens:
  - Botanical Garden of the Martin Luther University of Halle-Wittenberg, founded in 1698 in the former gardens of the Archbishops of Magdeburg, belonging to the Garden Dreams project
  - Reichardts Garten is a historic park, part of the Garden Dreams project. Laid out in 1794 by Johann Friedrich Reichardt (1752–1814) as an English garden, becoming the "accommodation of Romanticism". It changed ownership several times and the city of Halle bought the park in 1903 to give the public wider access.
  - Peißnitz Island
  - Pestalozzi Park
  - Zoological Garden (Bergzoo), situated on the Reilsberg hill.
- Galgenberge, location of the gallows from the 14th to the end of the 18th century
- Klausberge, porphyry hill, named after a chapel of the St Nicholas' brotherhood, panoramic view over the Saale Valley, Eichendorff's bench
- Dölauer Heide forest, including Bischofs Wiese with 35 graves dating back to about 2500–2000 BC, the Neolithic period
- Racecourse in the Passendorf Meadows
- Halle-Neustadt, to the west of Halle, built beginning 1964 (foundation stone ceremony 15 July 1964) as a socialist model city. Still has several monuments from the GDR, such as a giant mural dedicated to Lenin.

=== Image gallery ===
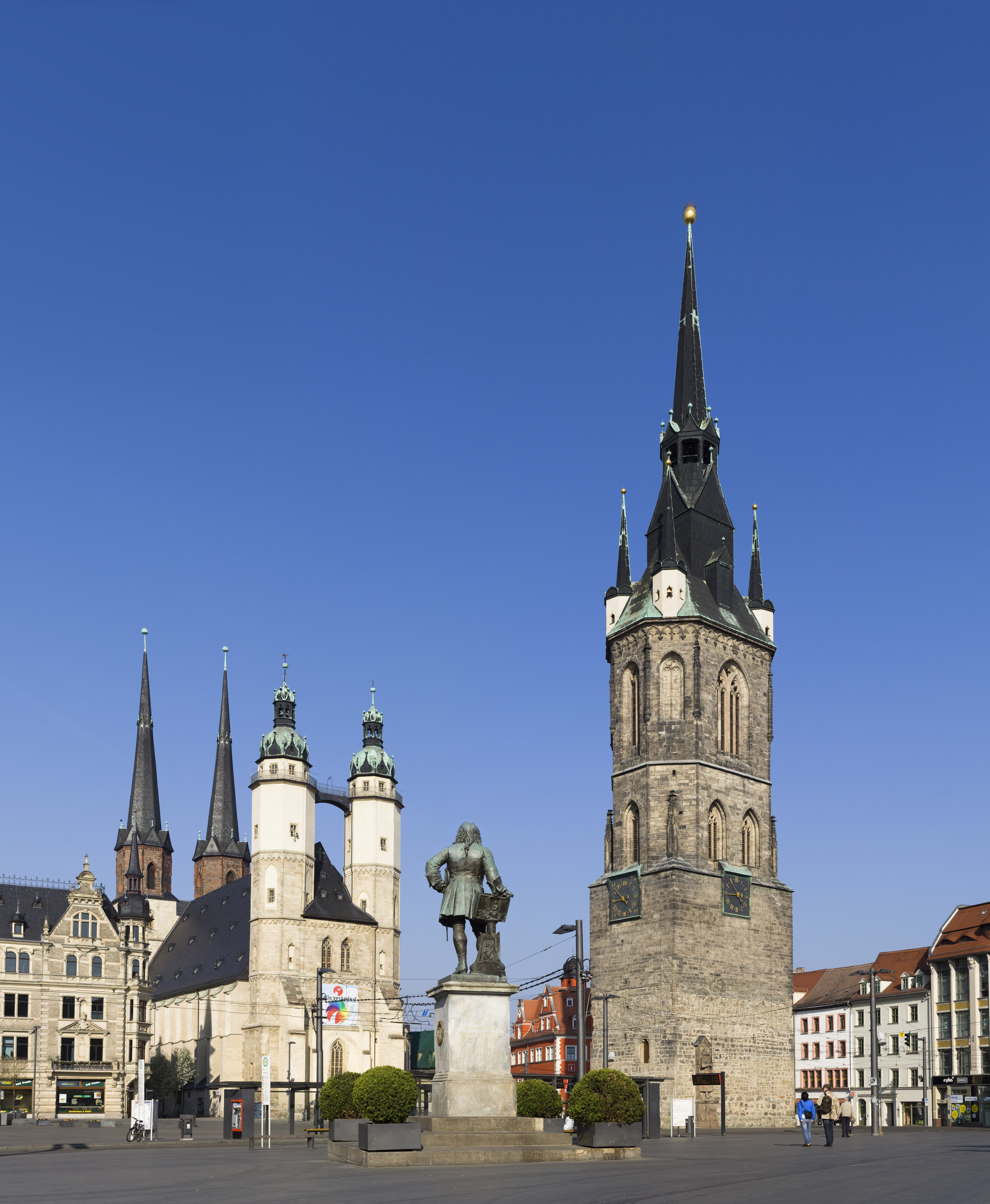
Market square

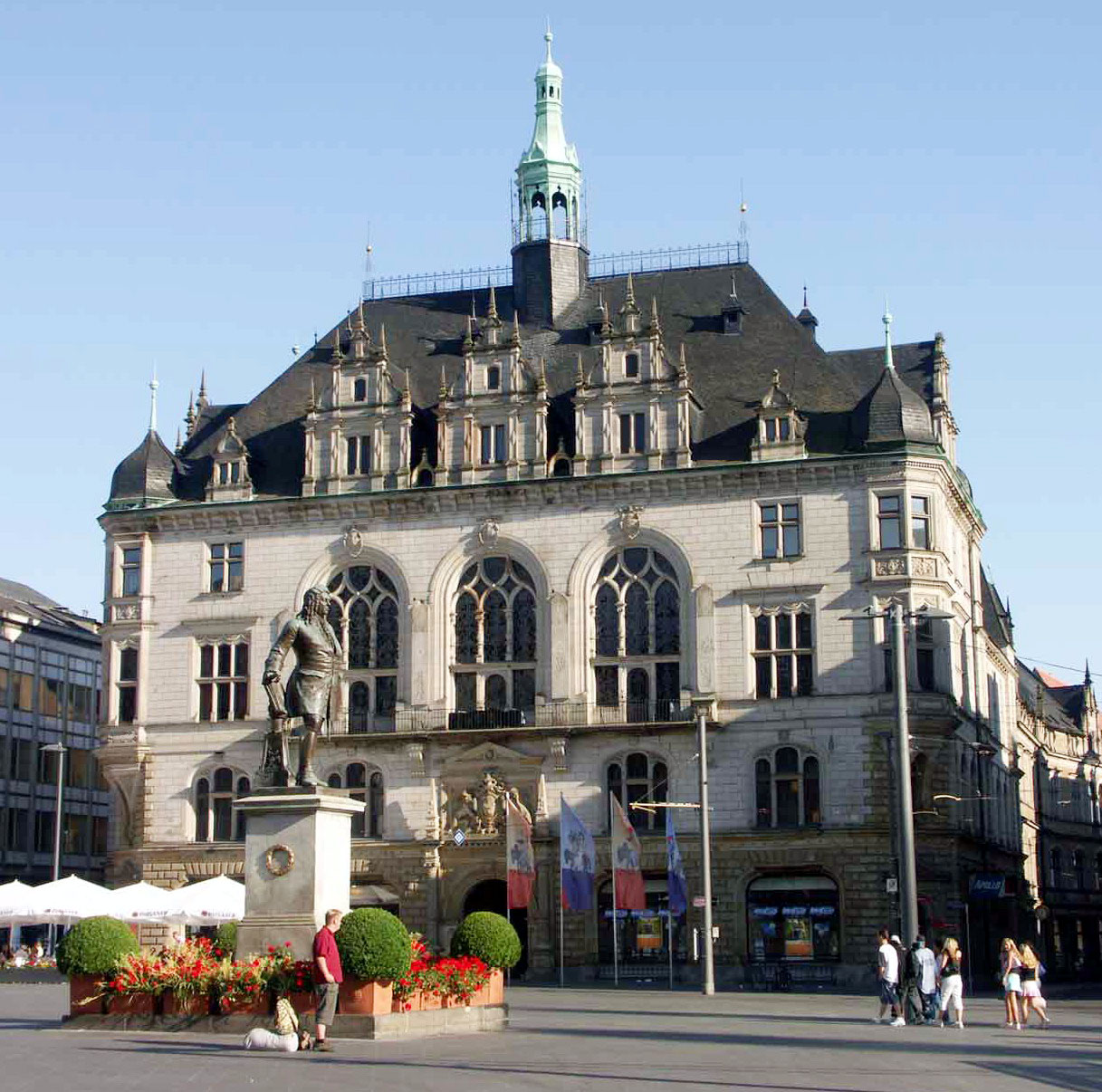
Stadthaus

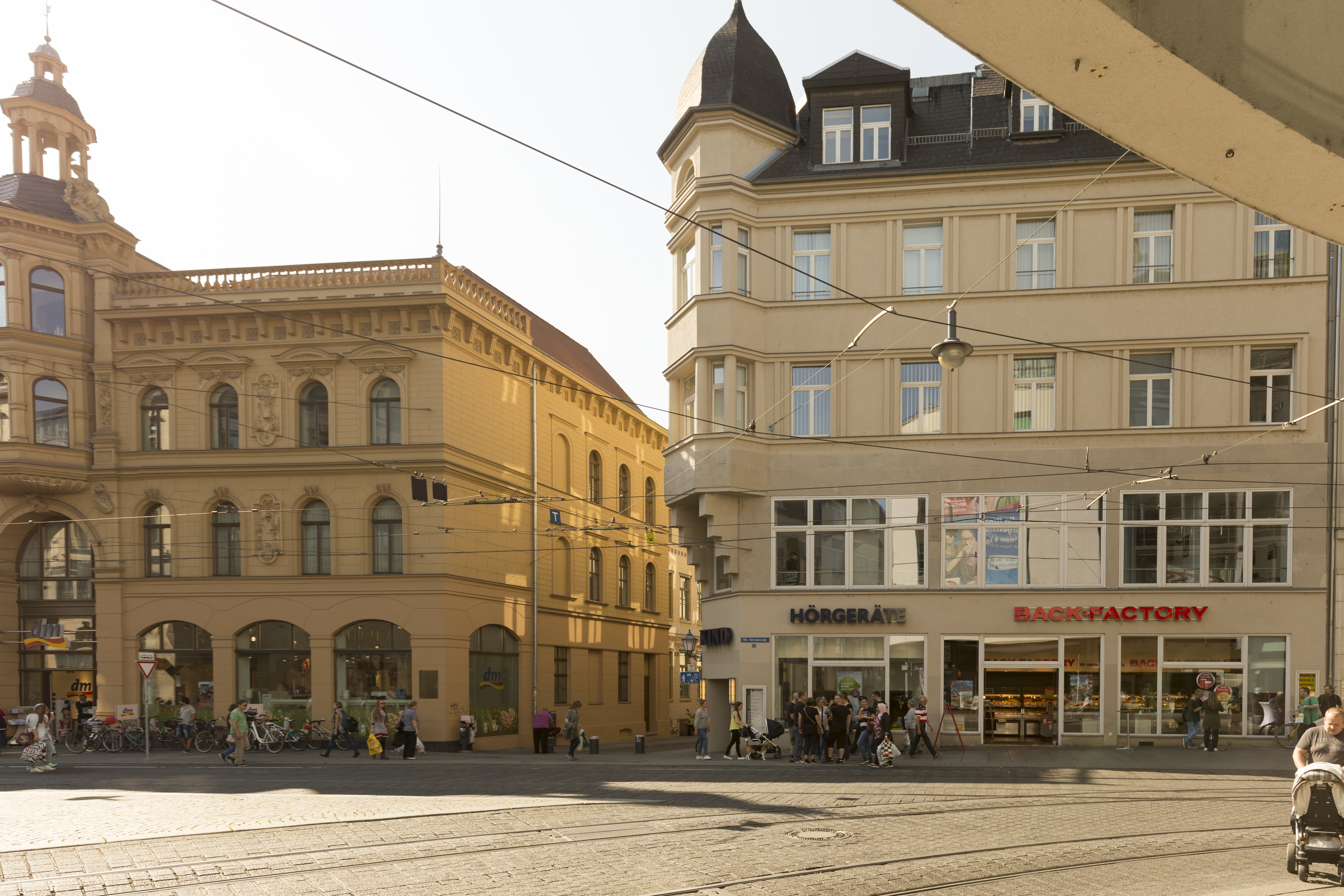
Old town

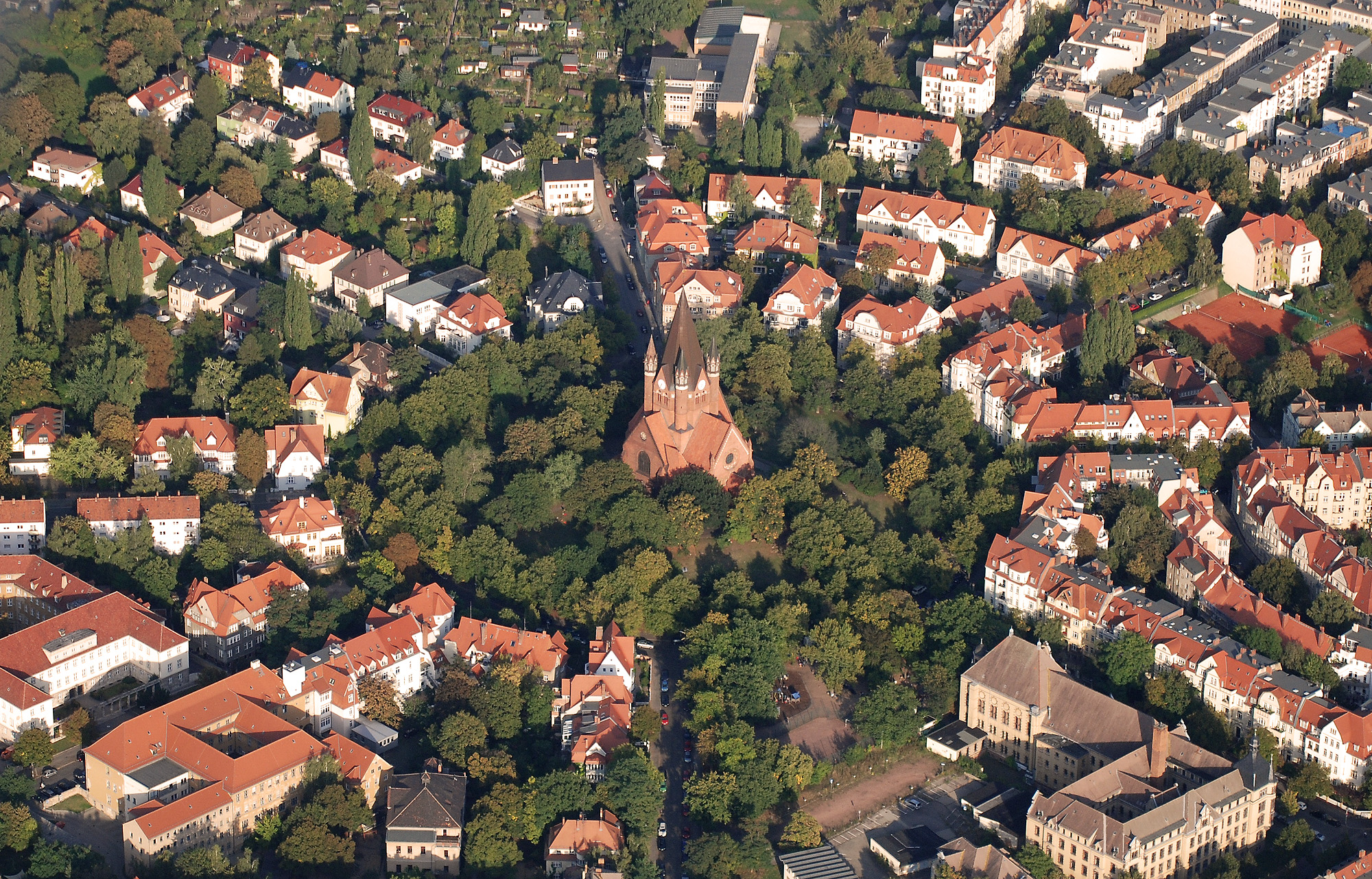
View over Paulusviertel

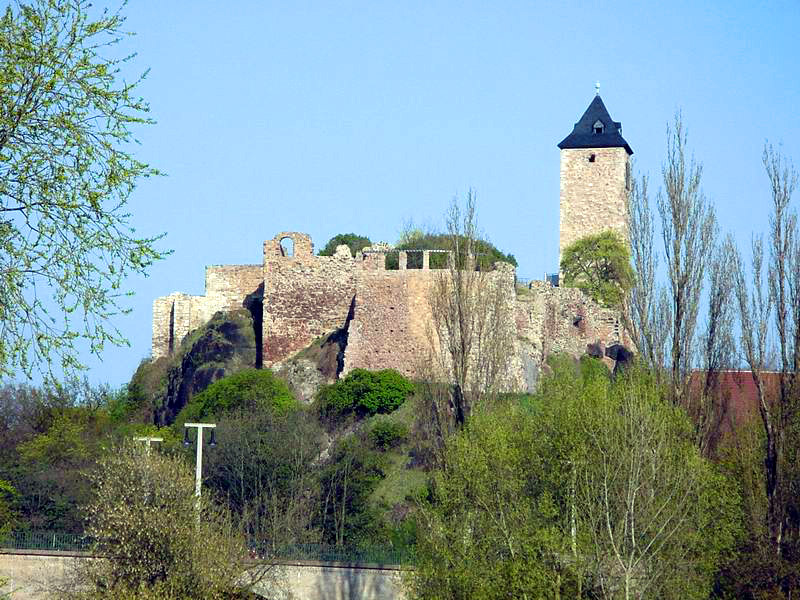
Giebichenstein Castle from Kröllwitz

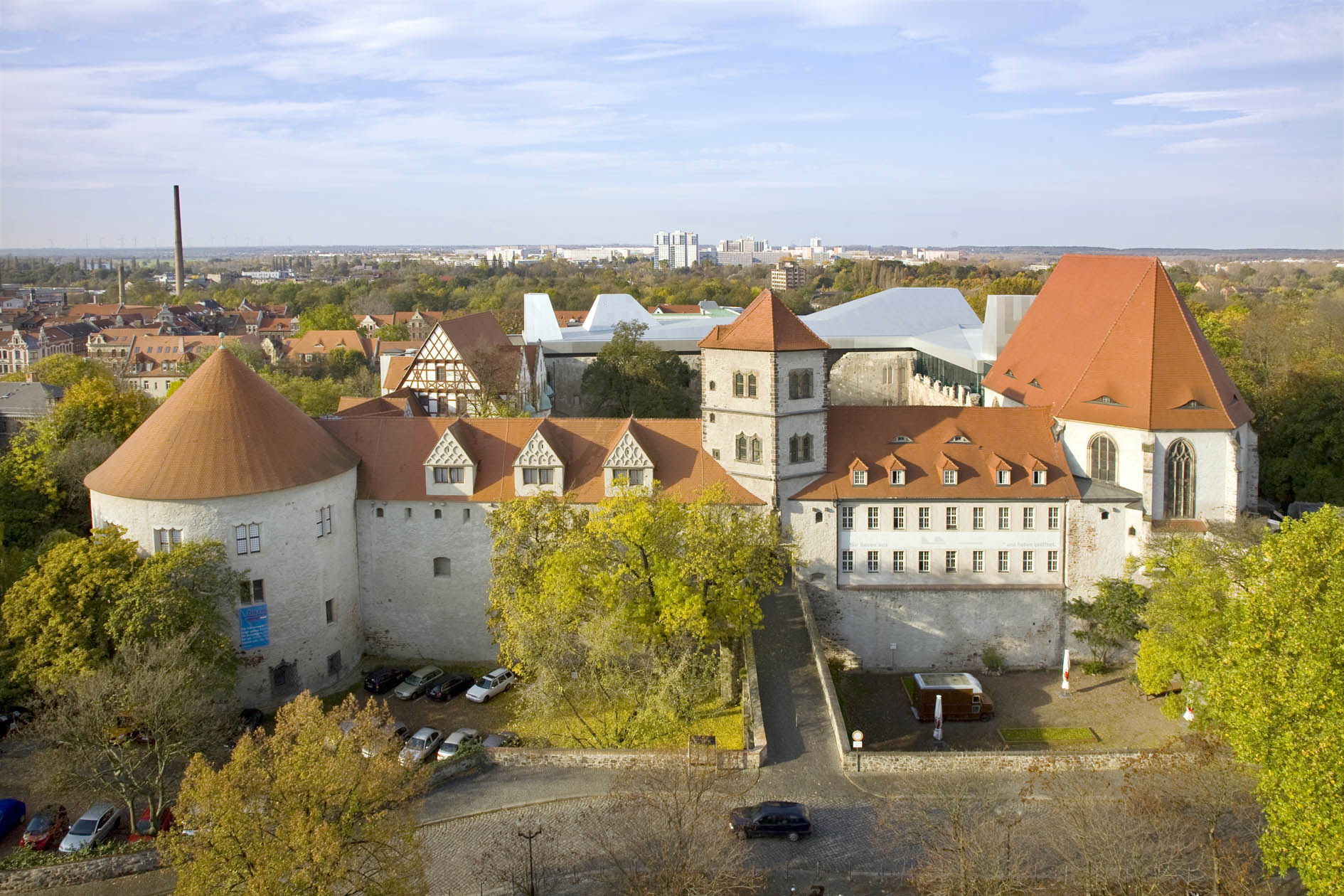
Moritzburg (Halle)

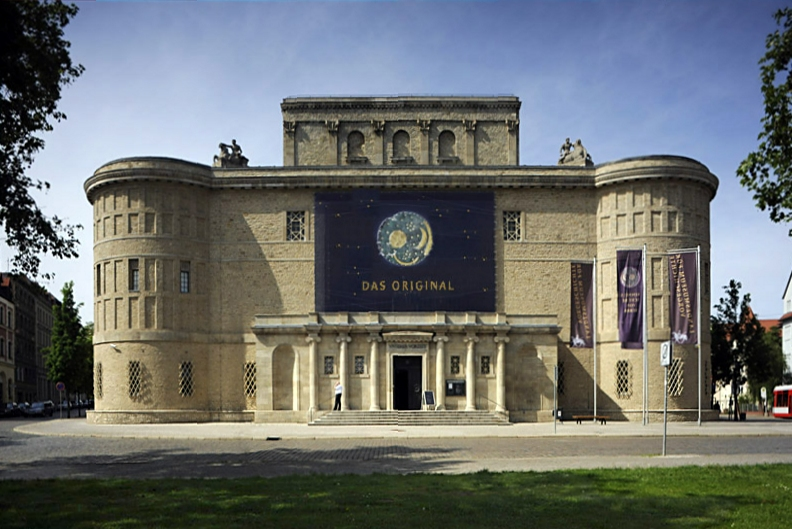
Halle State Museum of Prehistory

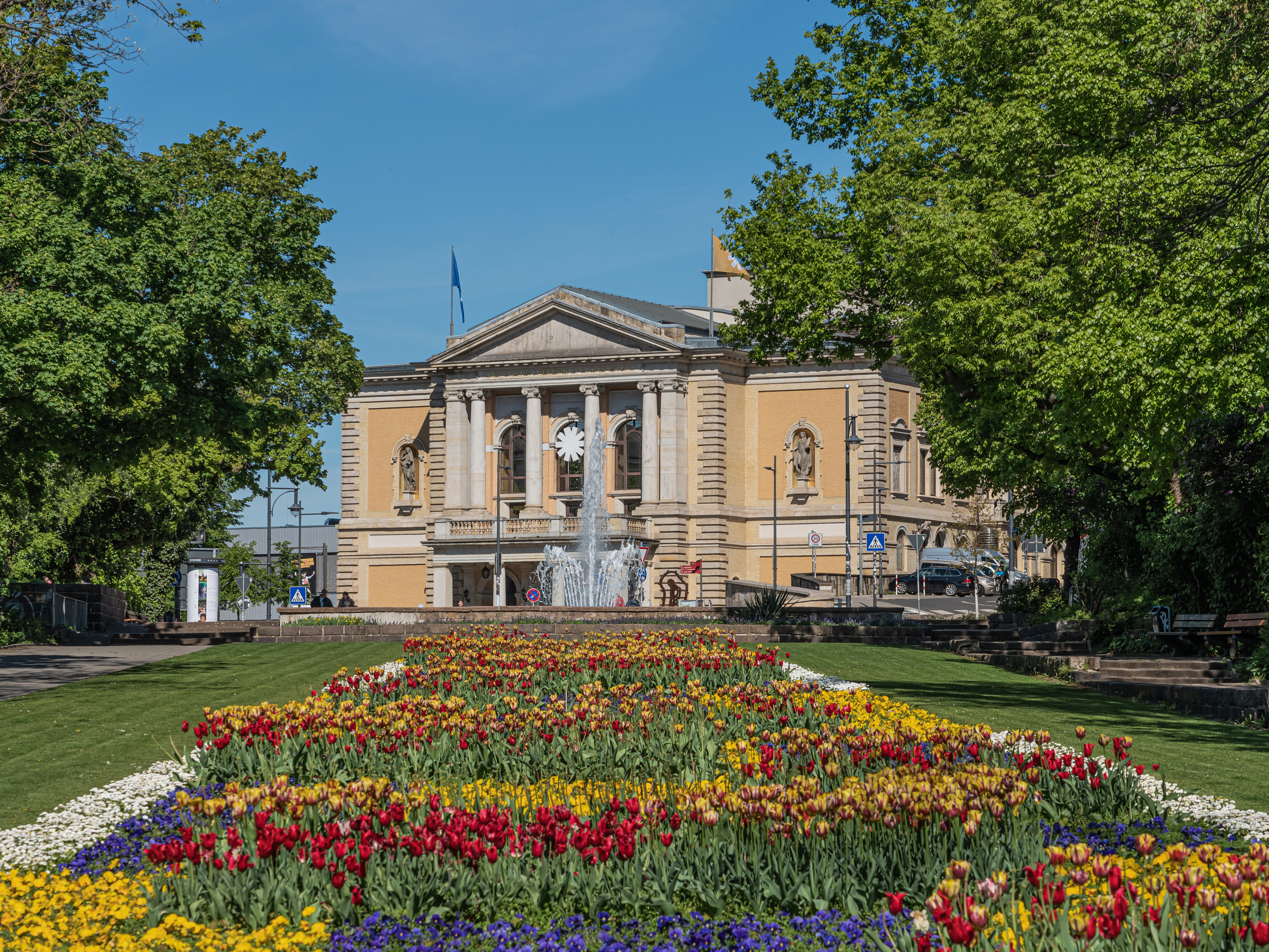
Halle Opera House

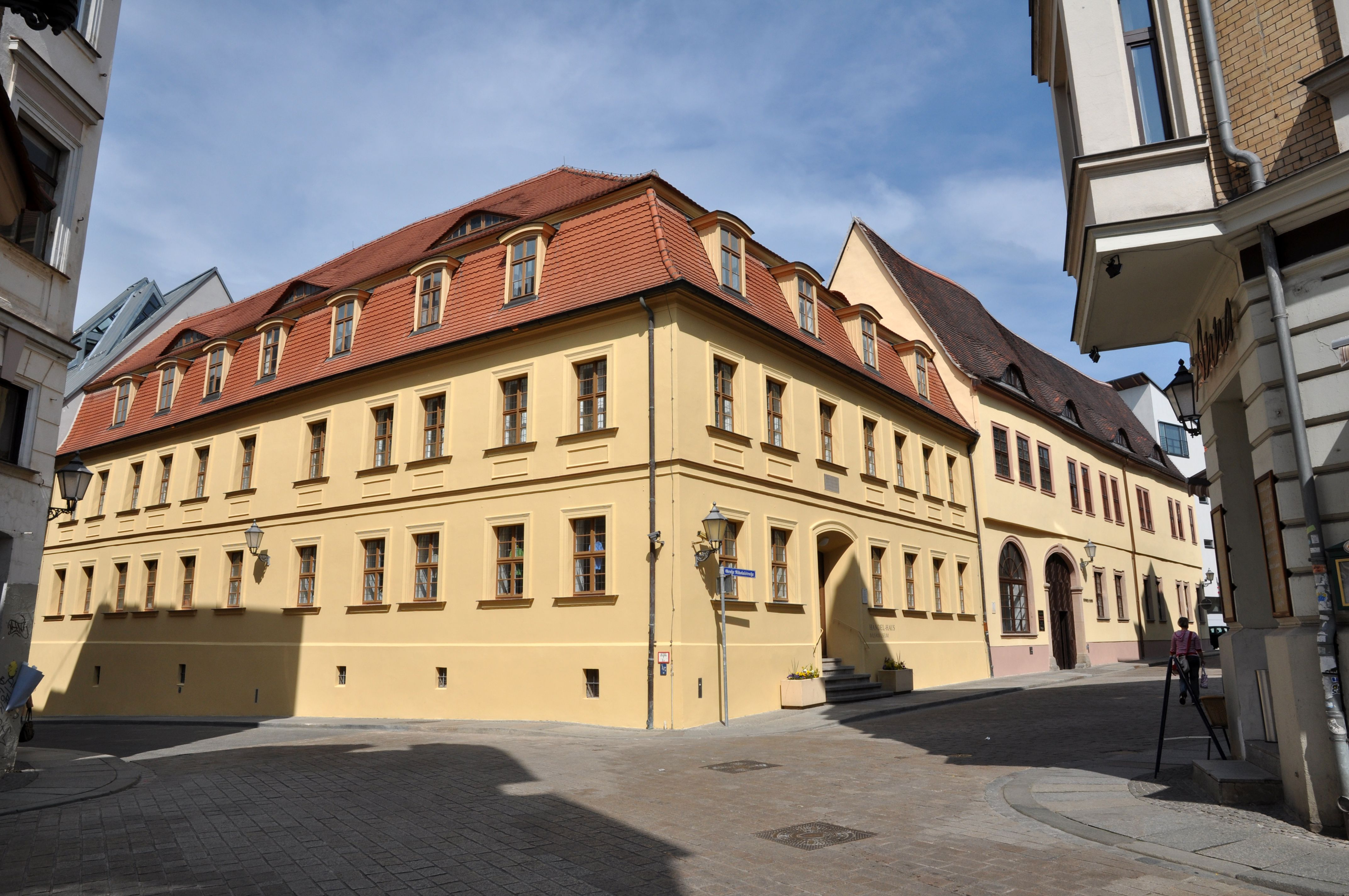
Handel House

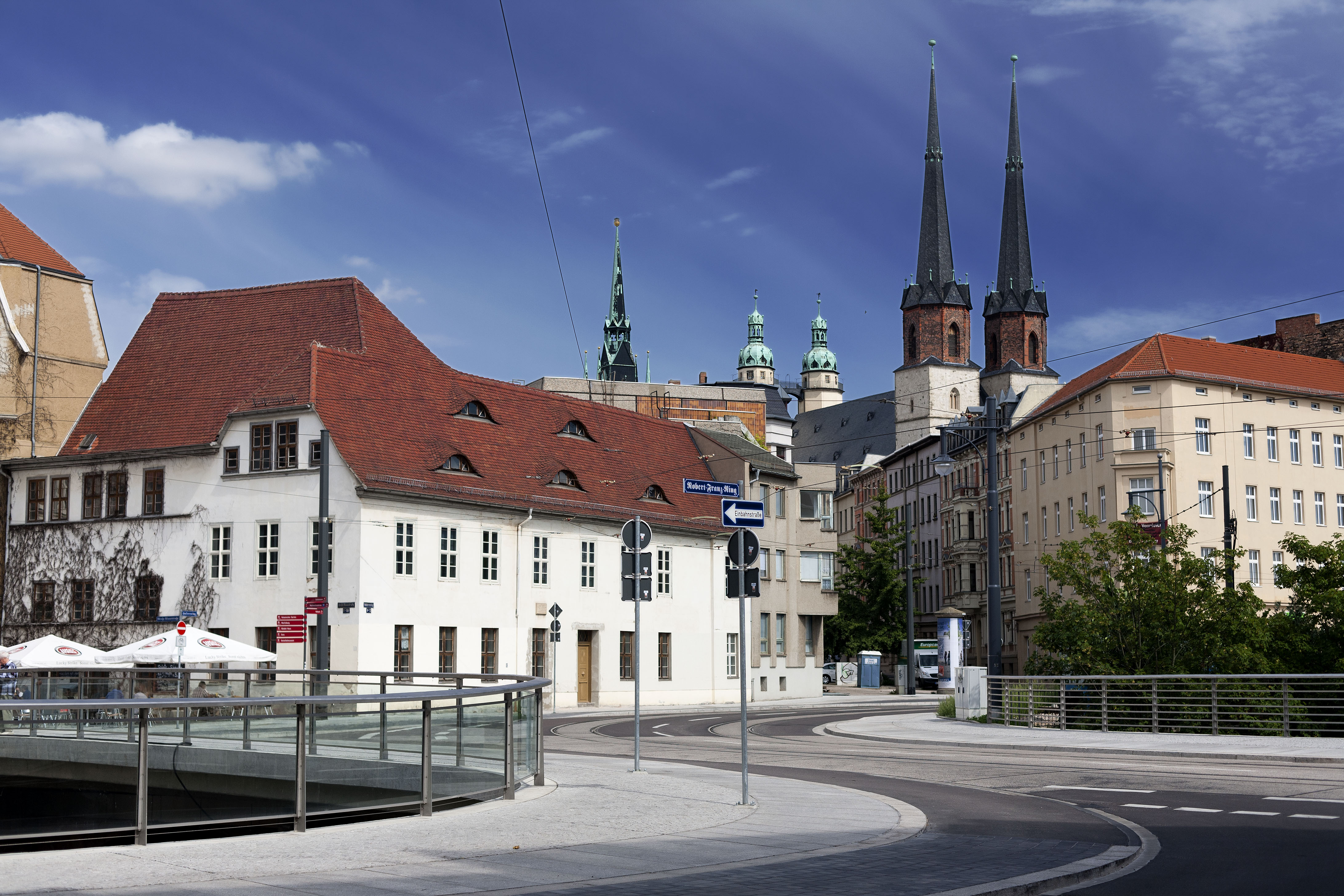
Wilhelm Friedemann Bach House to the left

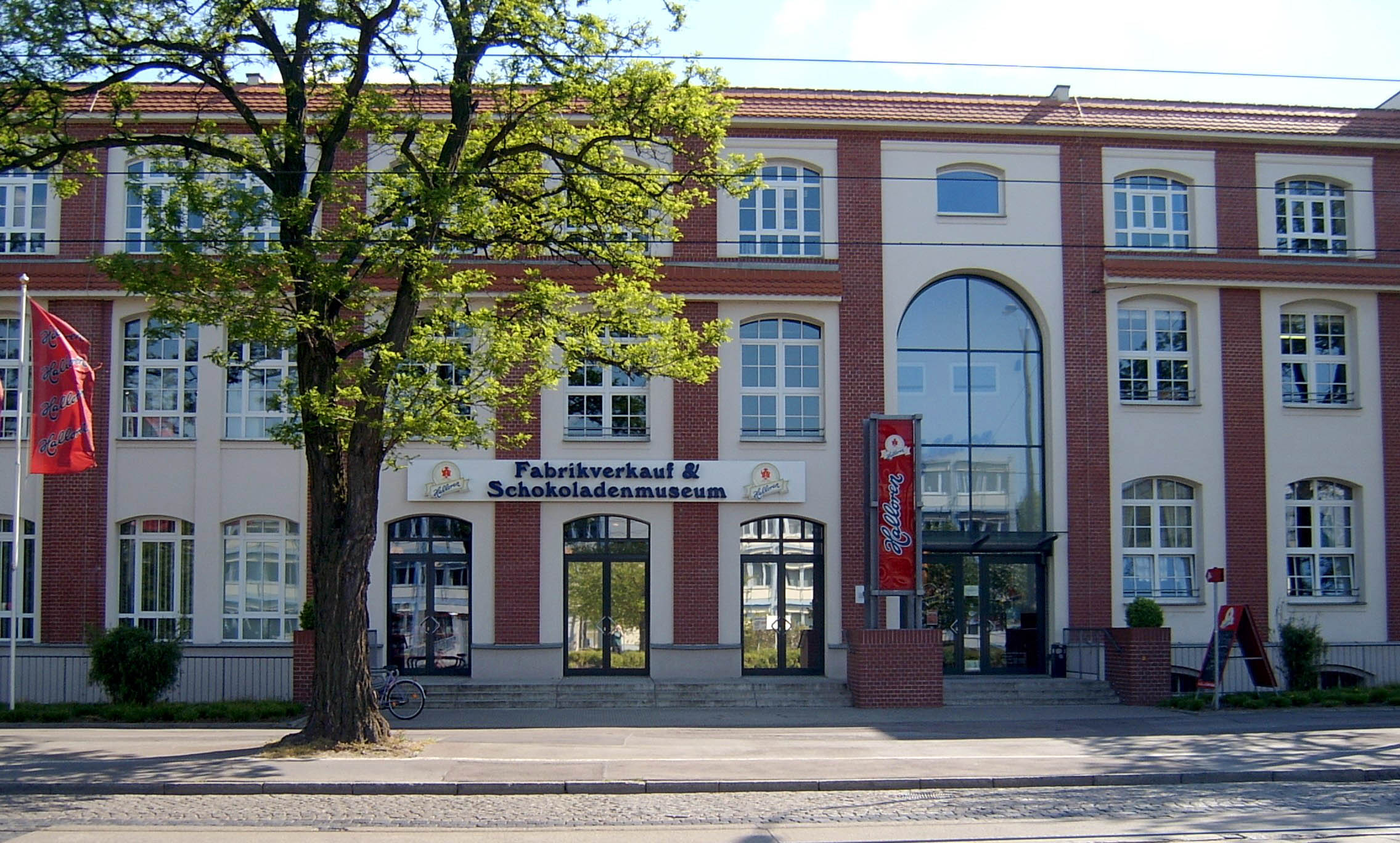
Halloren Chocolate Factory

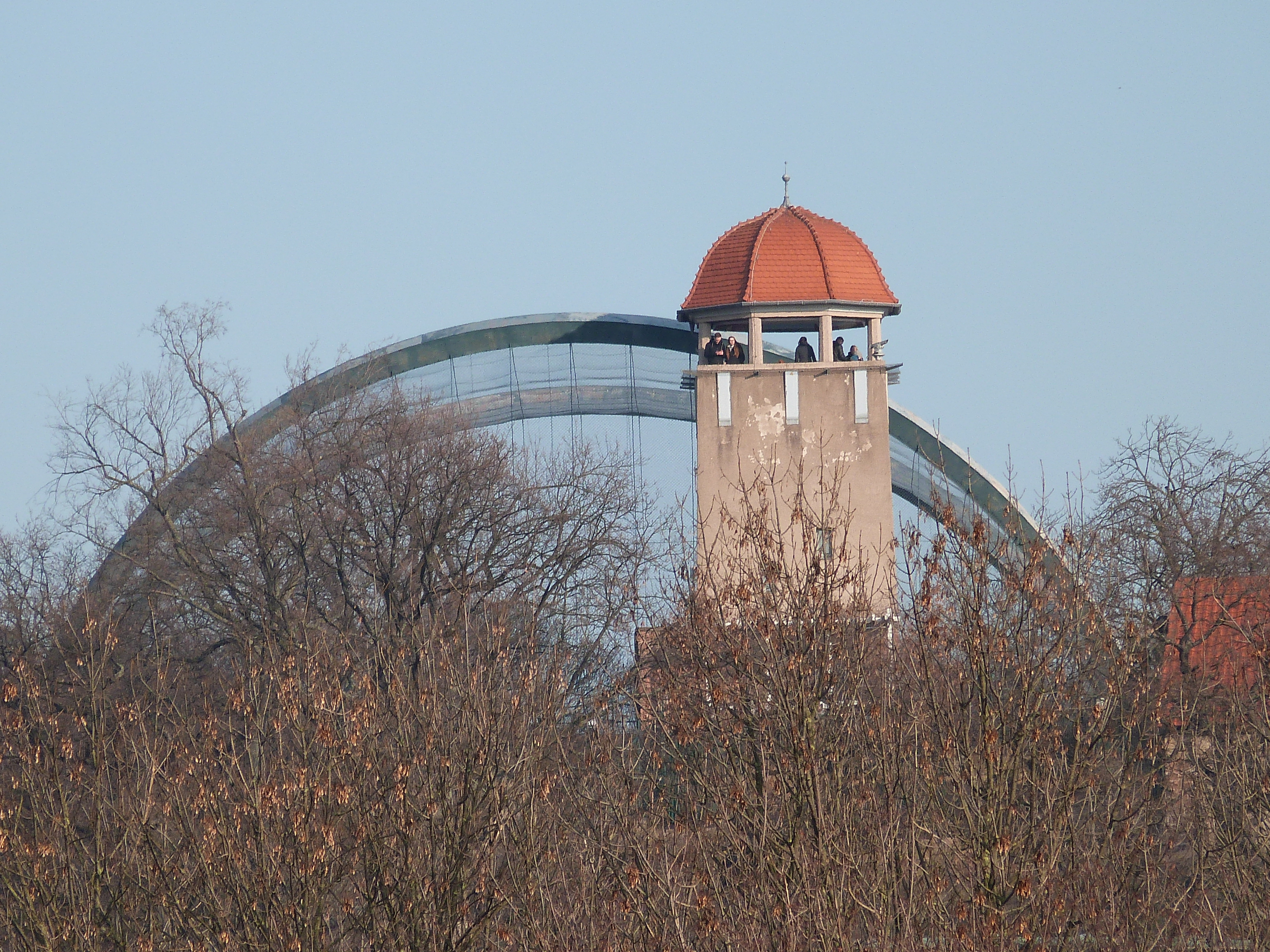
View to Reilberg of Zoo Halle

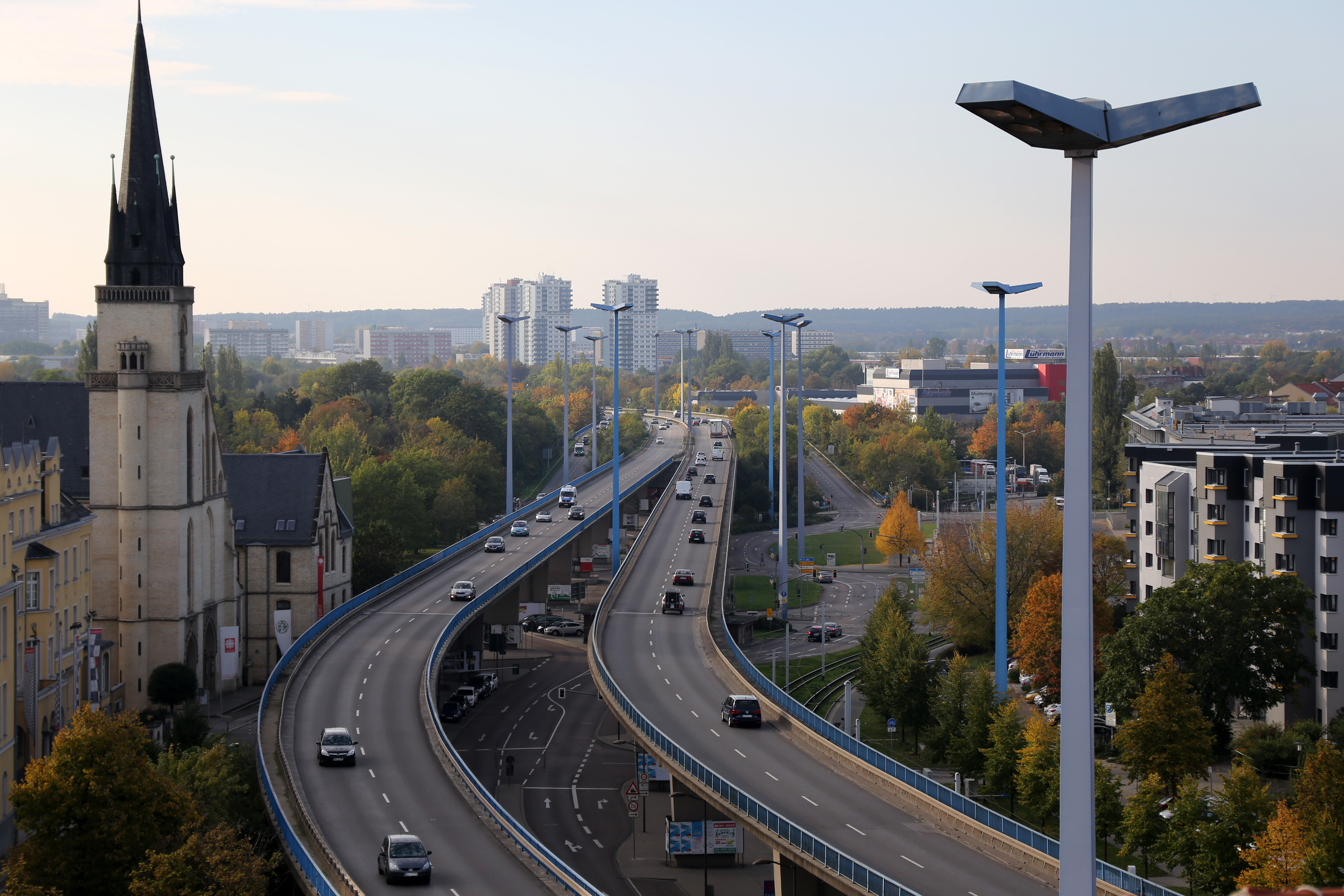
View to Halle-Neustadt

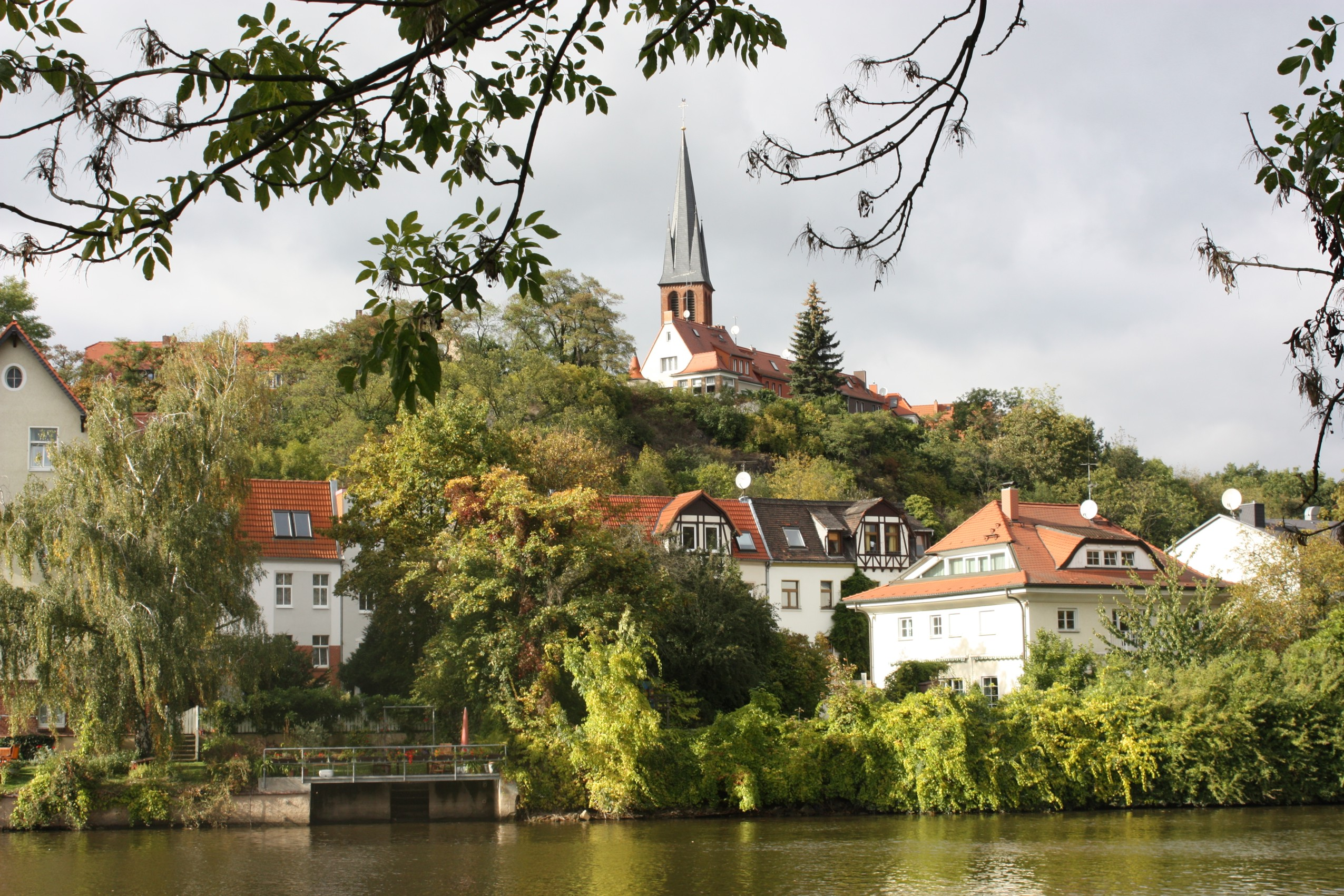
View over Kröllwitz

== Industrial heritage ==
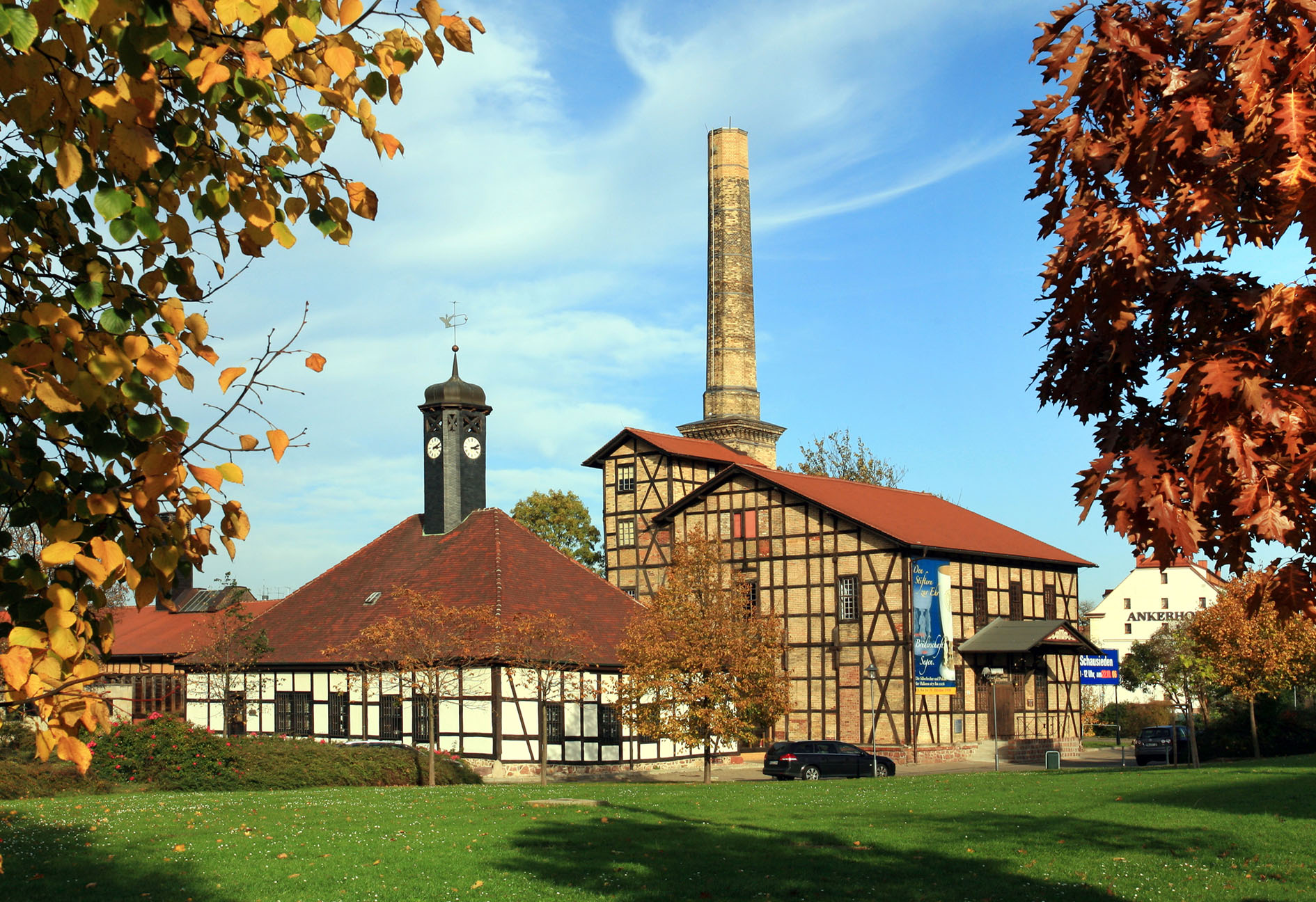
Hallors and Saline Museum

Salt, also known as white gold, was extracted from four "Borns" (well-like structures). The four Borns/brine named Gutjahrbrunnen, Meteritzbrunnen, Deutscher Born and Hackeborn, were located around the Hallmarket (or "Under Market"), now a market square with a fountain, just across from the TV station, MDR. The brine was highly concentrated and boiled in Koten, simple structured houses made from reed and clay. Salters, who wore a unique uniform with eighteen silver buttons, were known as Halloren, and this name was later used for the chocolates in the shape of these buttons.

The Halloren-Werke, the oldest chocolate factory in Germany, was founded in 1804. Old documents are on display and a chocolate room can be visited.

Within East Germany, Halle's chemical industry, now mainly shut down, was of great importance. The two main companies in the region were Buna-Werke and Leuna, and Halle-Neustadt was built in the 1960s to accommodate the employees of these two factories.

== Science and culture ==
Baroque composer Georg Friedrich Händel (later George Frideric Handel) was born in Halle in 1685 and spent the first 17 years of his life in the city. The house where he lived is now a museum about his life. To celebrate his music, Halle has staged a Handel Festival since 1922, annually in June since 1952. The Franckesche Stiftungen (Francke Foundations) are home to the Stadtsingechor zu Halle, which was founded before the year 1116 and is one of the oldest boys' choirs in the world.

The University of Halle was founded here in 1694. It is now combined with the University of Wittenberg and called the Martin Luther University of Halle-Wittenberg. The university's medical school was established by Friedrich Hoffmann. Its botanical garden, the Botanische Garten der Martin-Luther-Universität Halle-Wittenberg, dates back to 1698. Halle's German Academy of Sciences Leopoldina is the oldest and one of the most respected scientific societies in Germany. Halle is also home to Germany's oldest existing Protestant community church library, the Marienbibliothek, founded in 1552, it is the largest of its kind with 36,000 titles. The seat of the Max Planck Institute for Social Anthropology, one of the world's largest social anthropological research institutions and a part of the Max Planck Society, is in Halle.

Halle was a centre of German Pietism and played an important role in establishing the Lutheran church in North America, when Henry Muhlenberg and others were sent as missionaries to Pennsylvania in the mid-18th century. Muhlenberg is now called the first Patriarch of the Lutheran Church in America. He and his son, Frederick Muhlenberg, who was the first Speaker of the United States House of Representatives, were graduates of Halle University.

The Silver Treasure of the Halloren is displayed occasionally at the Technical Museum Saline. It is a unique collection of silver and gold goblets dating back to 1266. The ancient craft of "Schausieden" (boiling of the brine) can be observed there too. The State Museum of Prehistory houses the Nebra sky disk, a significant Bronze-Age find with astronomical significance.

Halle Zoo contributes to the EAZA breeding programme, in particular for the Angolan lion and the Malaysian tiger. Halle is also known for its thriving coypu (or nutria) population, which is native to South America.

With writers such as Heine, Eichendorff, Schleiermacher, Tieck and Novalis the town was a vibrant scene of the German Romanticism. Also Johann Wolfgang von Goethe was a regular guest at the house of his close friend Johann Friedrich Reichardt.

German-American expressionist painter Lyonel Feininger worked in Halle on an invitation by the city from 1929 to 1931. The Lyonel-Feininger-Gymnasium, a college-preparatory secondary school in the town center, is named after him. As one of eleven views of the city termed Halle Cycle, he painted in 1931 Die Türme über der Stadt (The towers above the city), which is now in the Museum Ludwig in Cologne. This painting appeared on a 55 eurocent stamp on 5 December 2002 as a part of the series "Deutsche Malerei des 20. Jahrhunderts" (German painting of the 20th century).

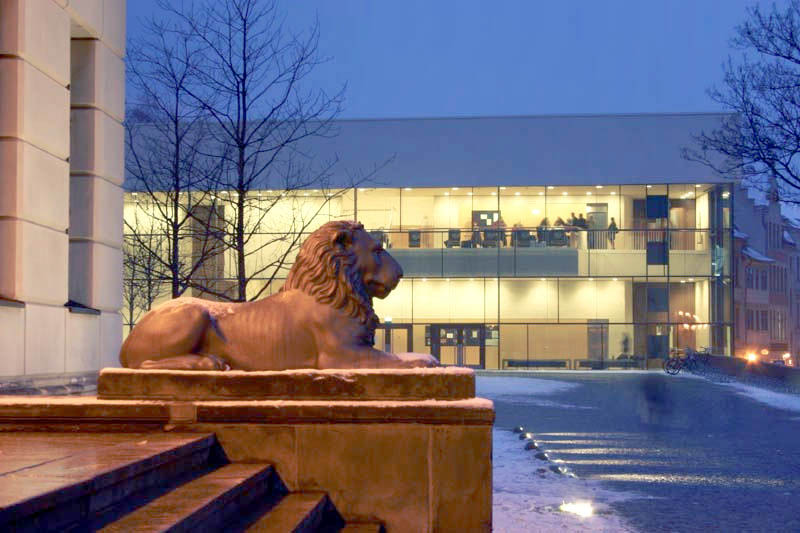
Martin Luther University of Halle-Wittenberg

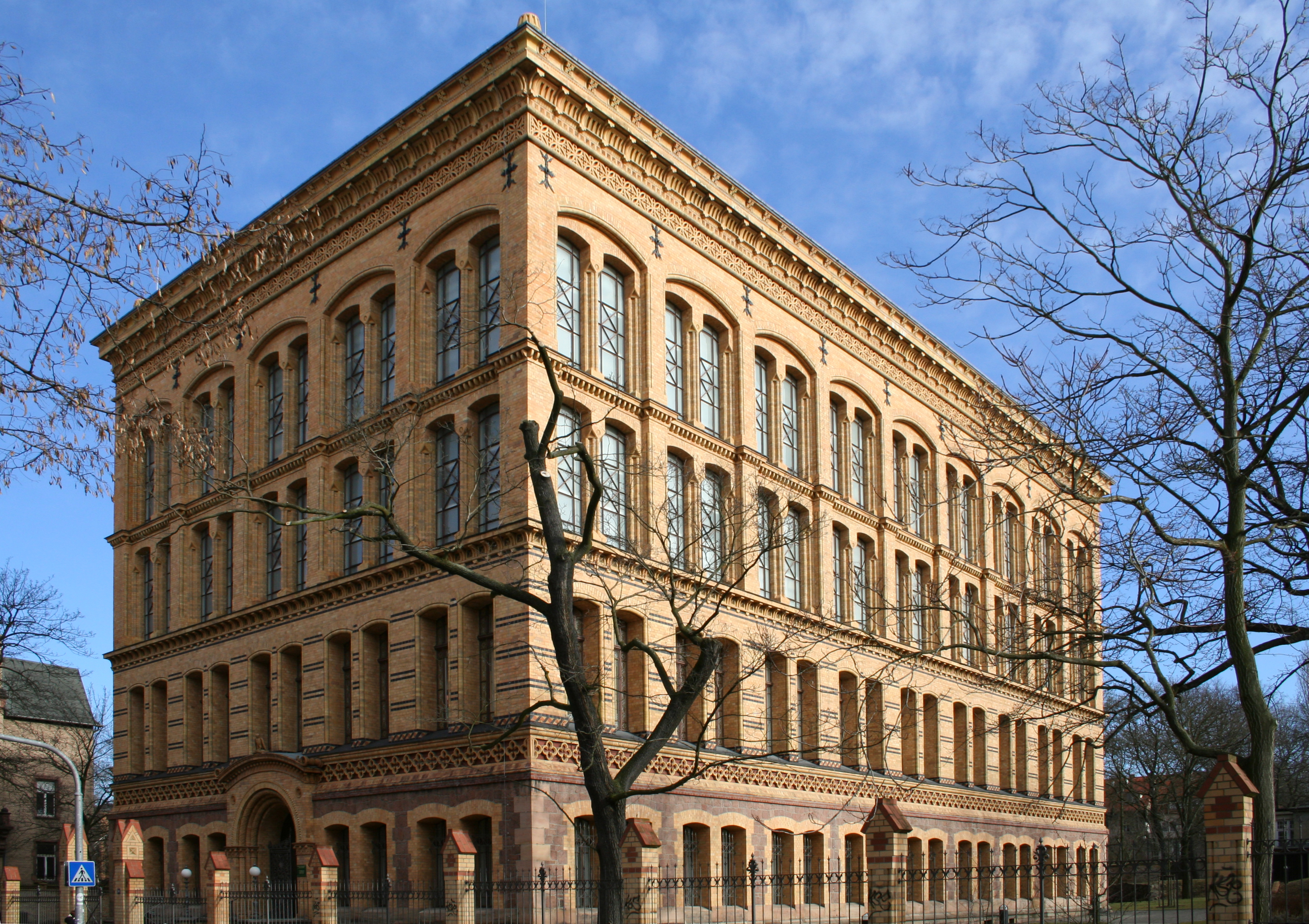
University and State Library

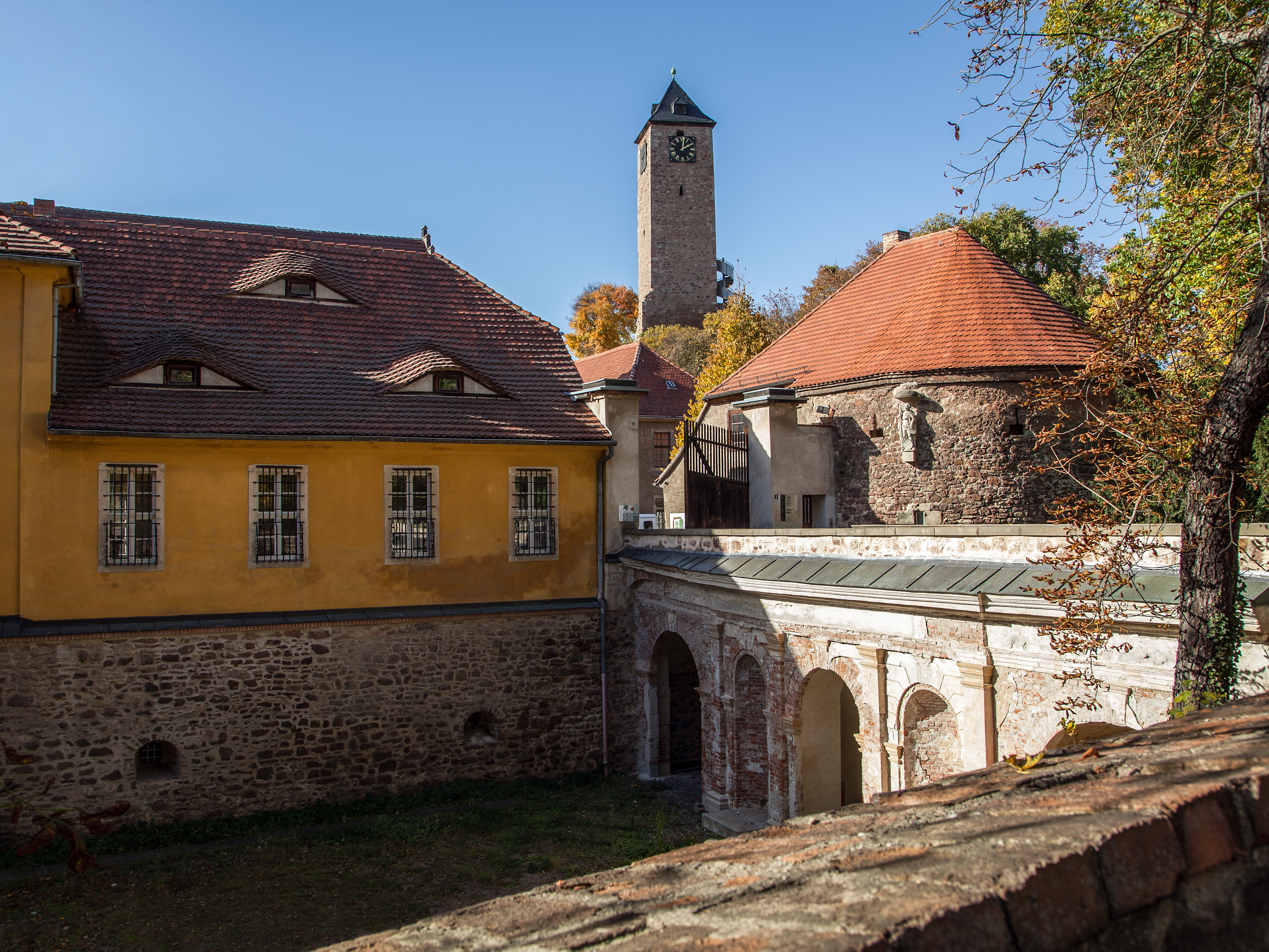
Burg Giebichenstein University of Art and Design

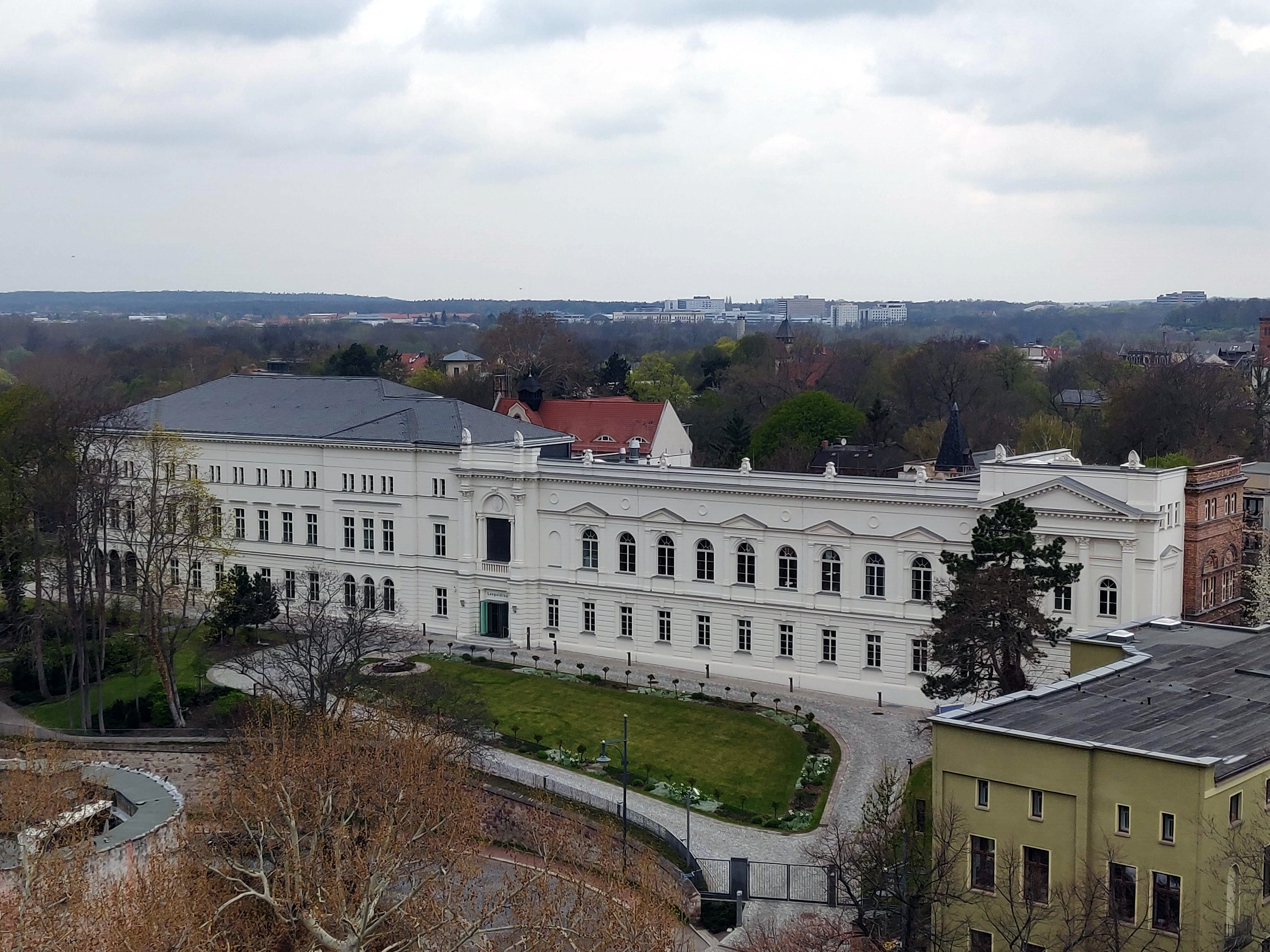
German National Academy of Sciences Leopoldina

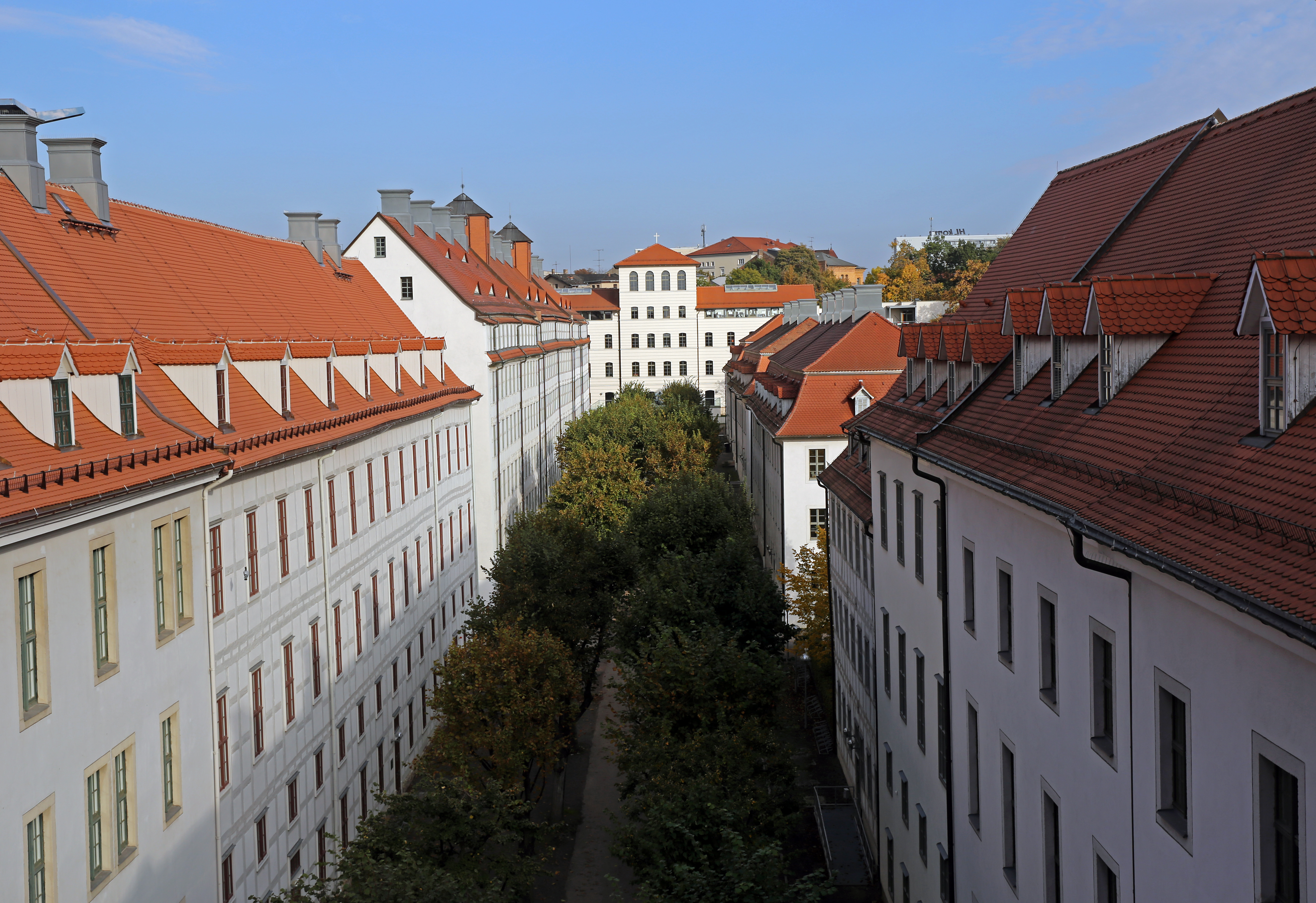
Francke Foundations

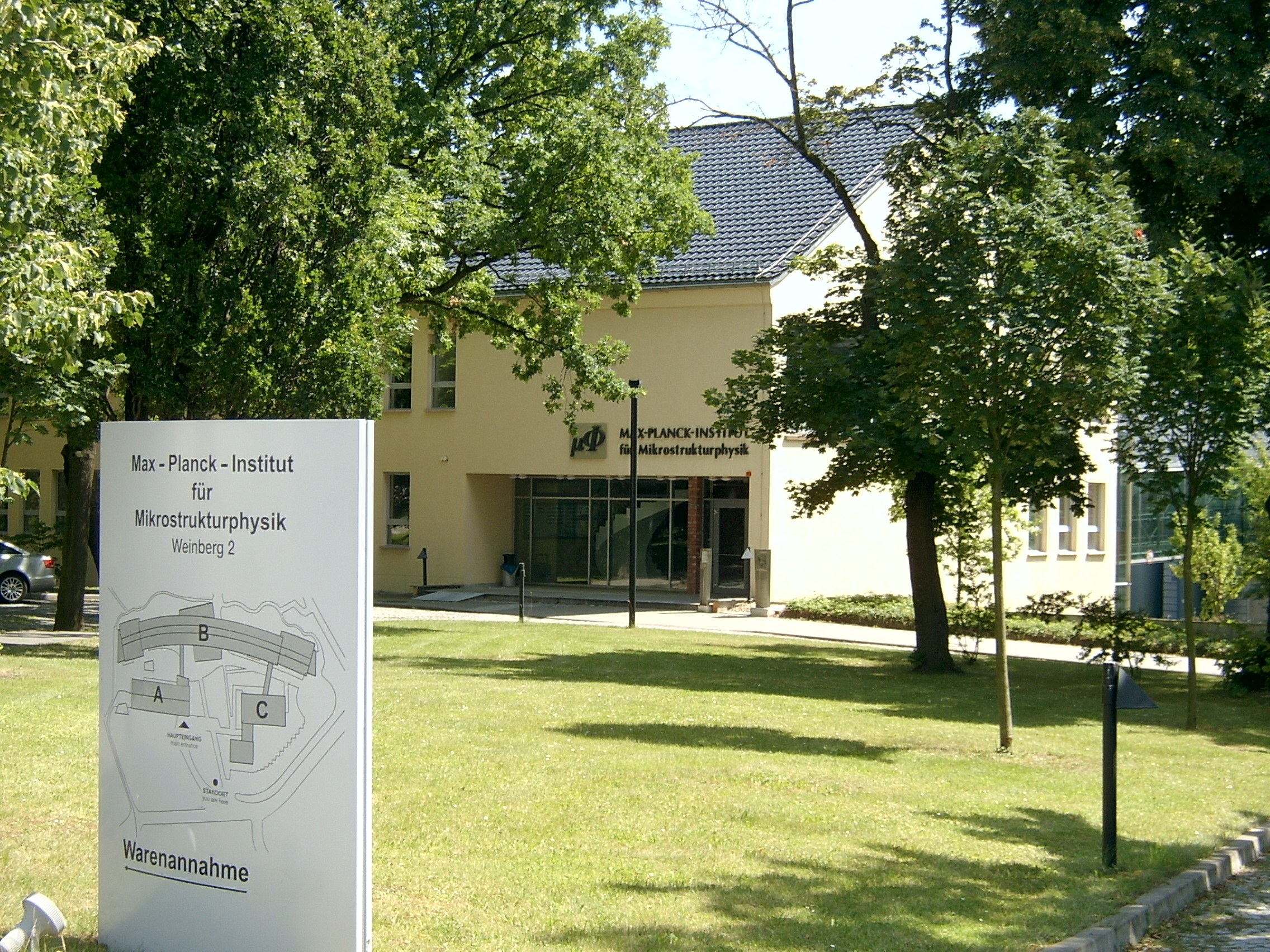
Max Planck Institute of Microstructure Physics at Weinberg Campus Technology Park

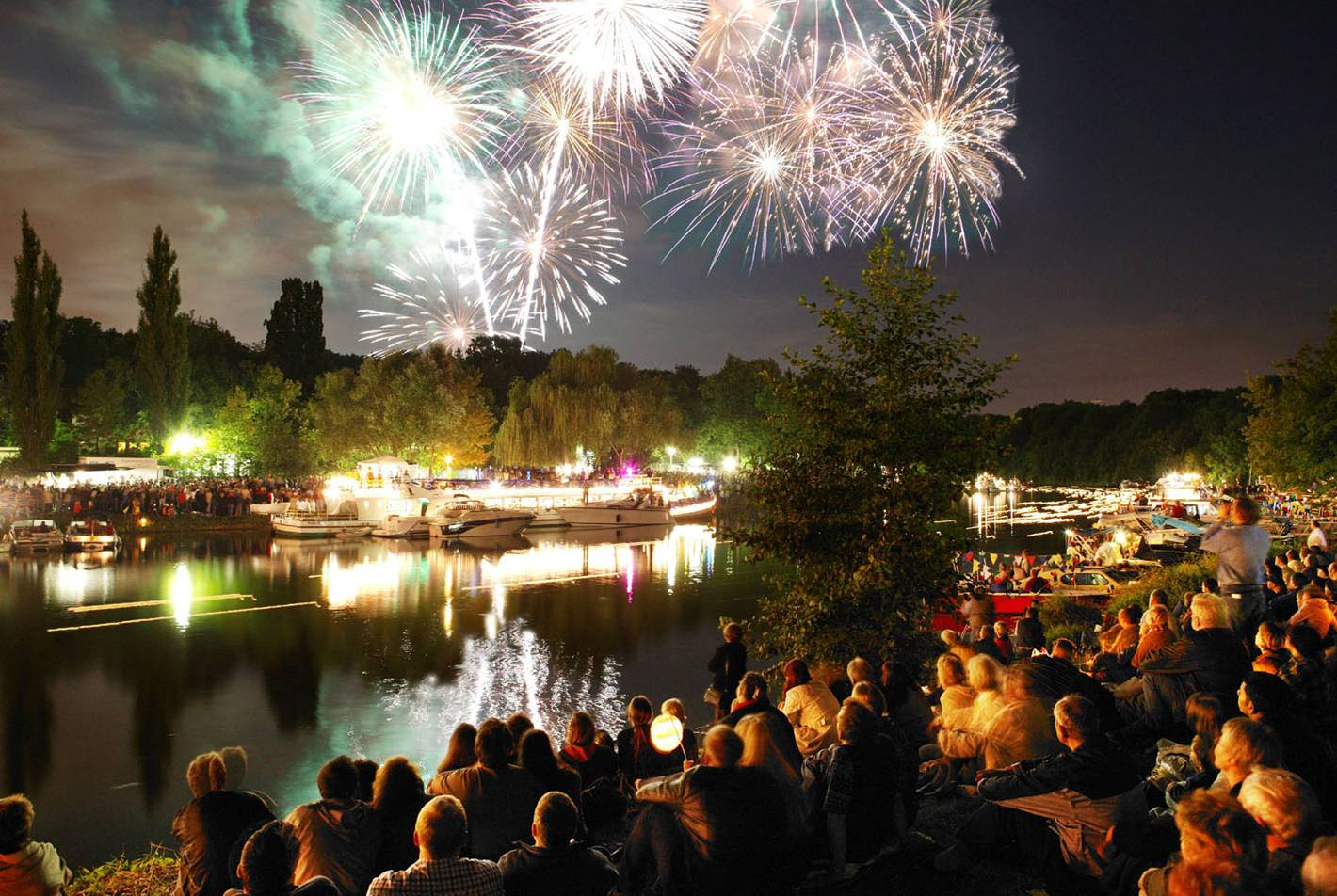
The Laternenfestival at Peißnitzisland

== Transport ==
Ludwig Wucherer made Halle an important rail hub in central Germany. In 1840 he opened the Magdeburg-Halle-Leipzig line, completing a connection between Magdeburg and Dresden. From 1841 to 1860, other lines to Erfurt, Kassel and Berlin followed.

The centrepiece of Halle's urban public transport system is the Halle (Saale) tramway network. It includes the world's first major electric-powered inner-city tram line, which was opened in 1891. Halle (Saale) Hauptbahnhof is the main railway station.

Halle's prominence as a railway centre grew with the arrival of the Erfurt-Leipzig/Halle high-speed railway. Leipzig is also connected to this route, but since it is mostly a terminus station (the Leipzig City Tunnel, opened in 2013, is mostly used by suburban S-Bahn trains and unsuitable for the high-speed network) and the route via Halle is shorter, Halle is used as an intermediate stop by many Berlin-Munich trains.

Leipzig/Halle Airport (opened in 1927) is an international airport located in Schkeuditz, Saxony, and serves both Leipzig, Saxony, and Halle, Saxony-Anhalt. As of 2018 it is Germany's 11th largest airport by passengers, handling more than 2.57 million mainly with flights to European leisure destinations. In terms of cargo traffic, the airport is the fifth-busiest in Europe and the second-busiest in Germany after Frankfurt Airport.

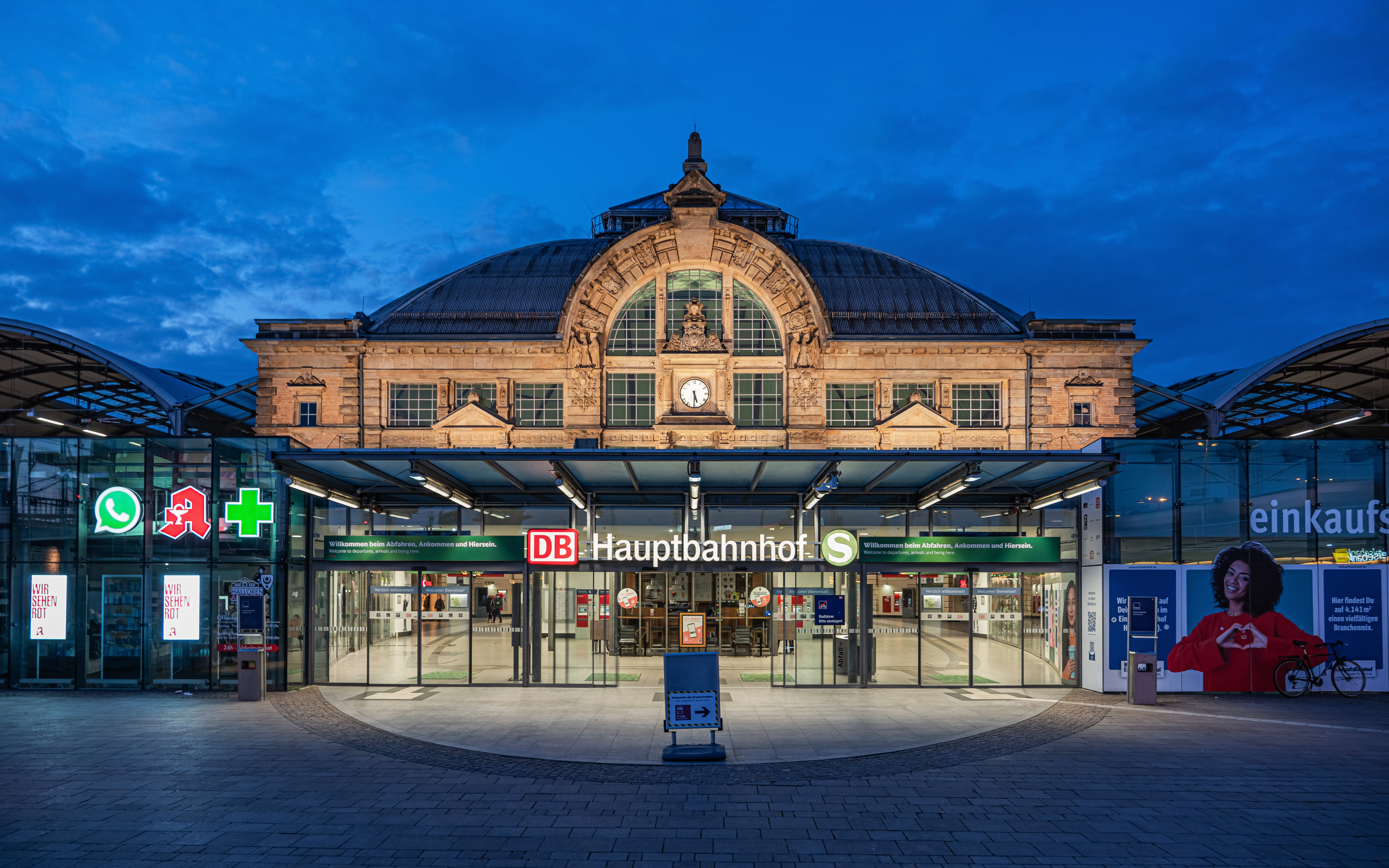
Halle (Saale) Hauptbahnhof, the main railway station

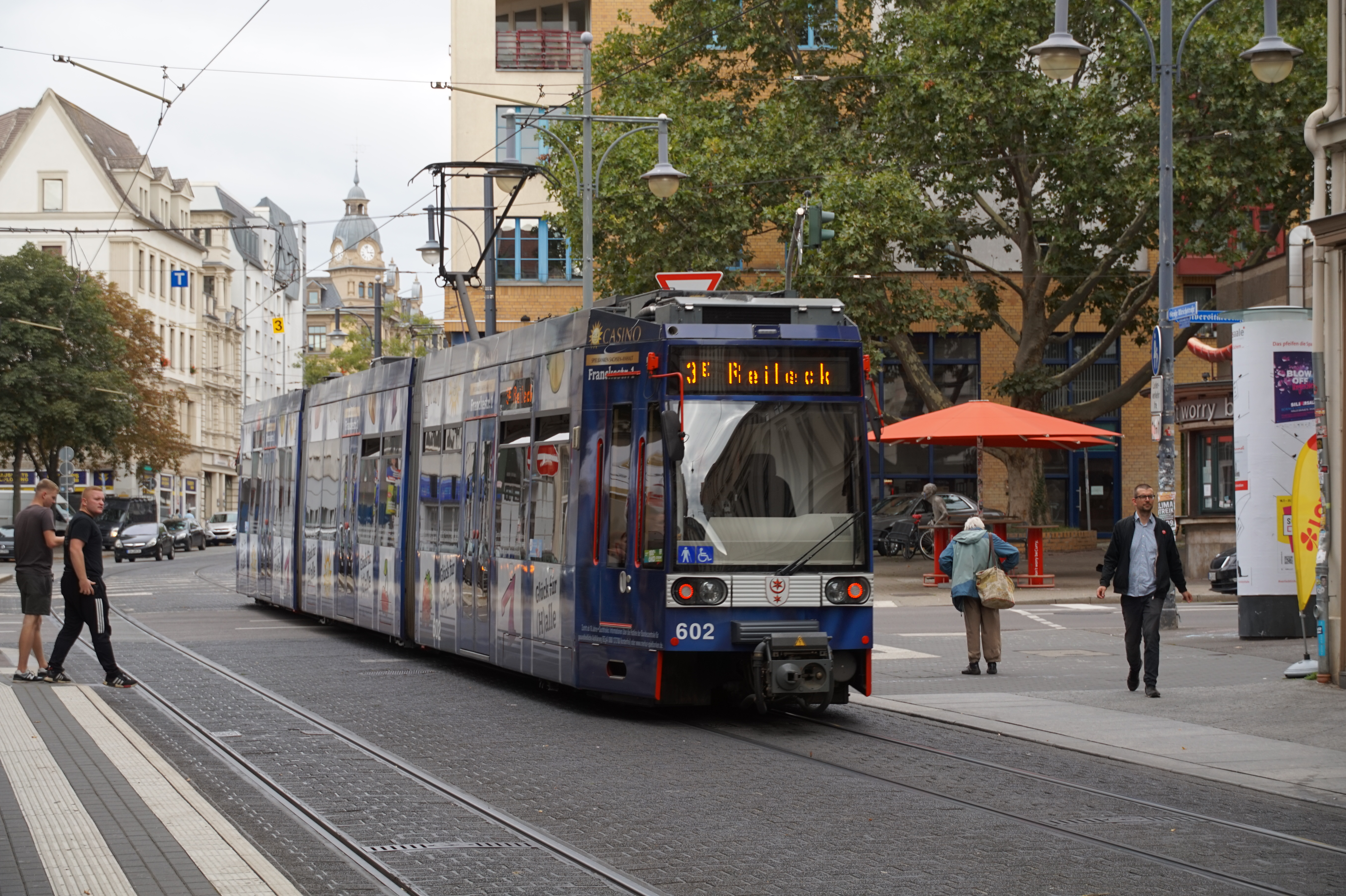
Tram in Halle

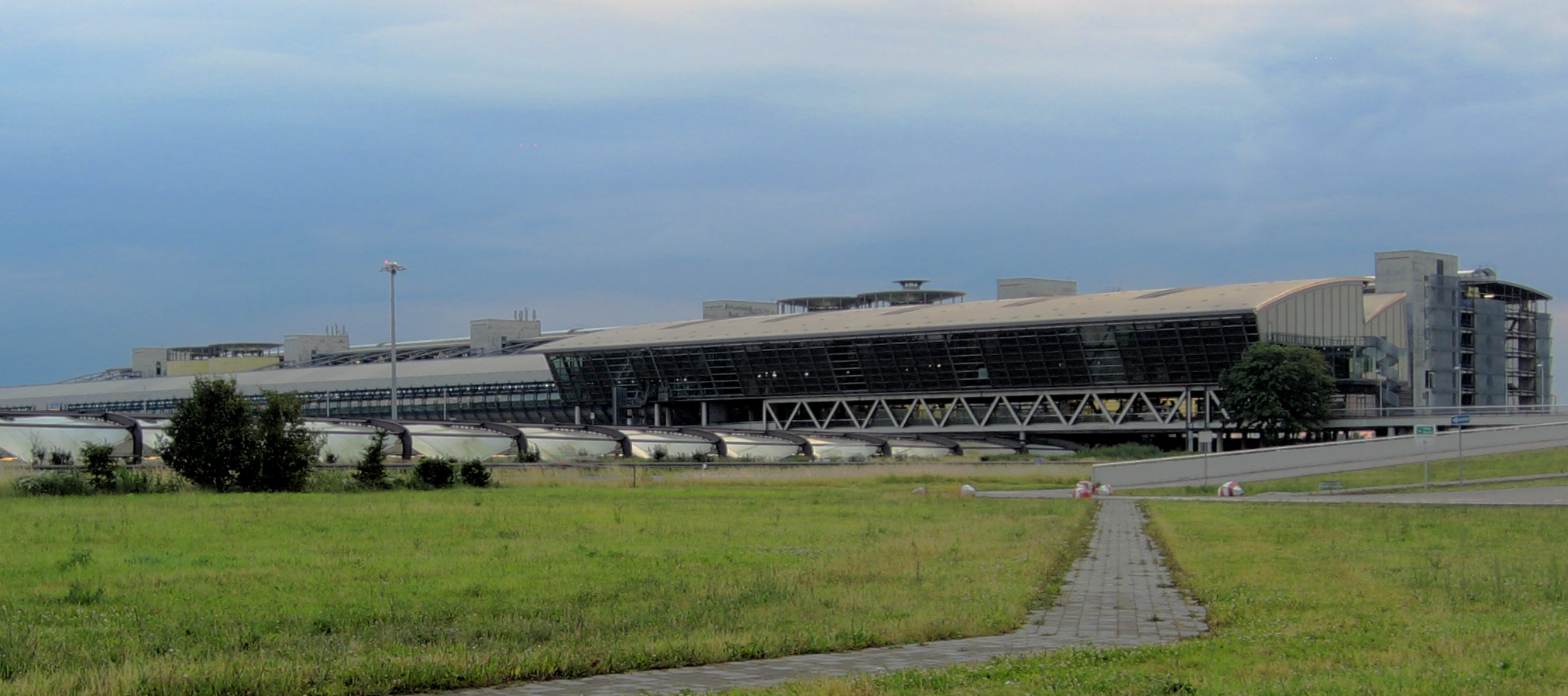
Leipzig/Halle Airport

== Sport ==
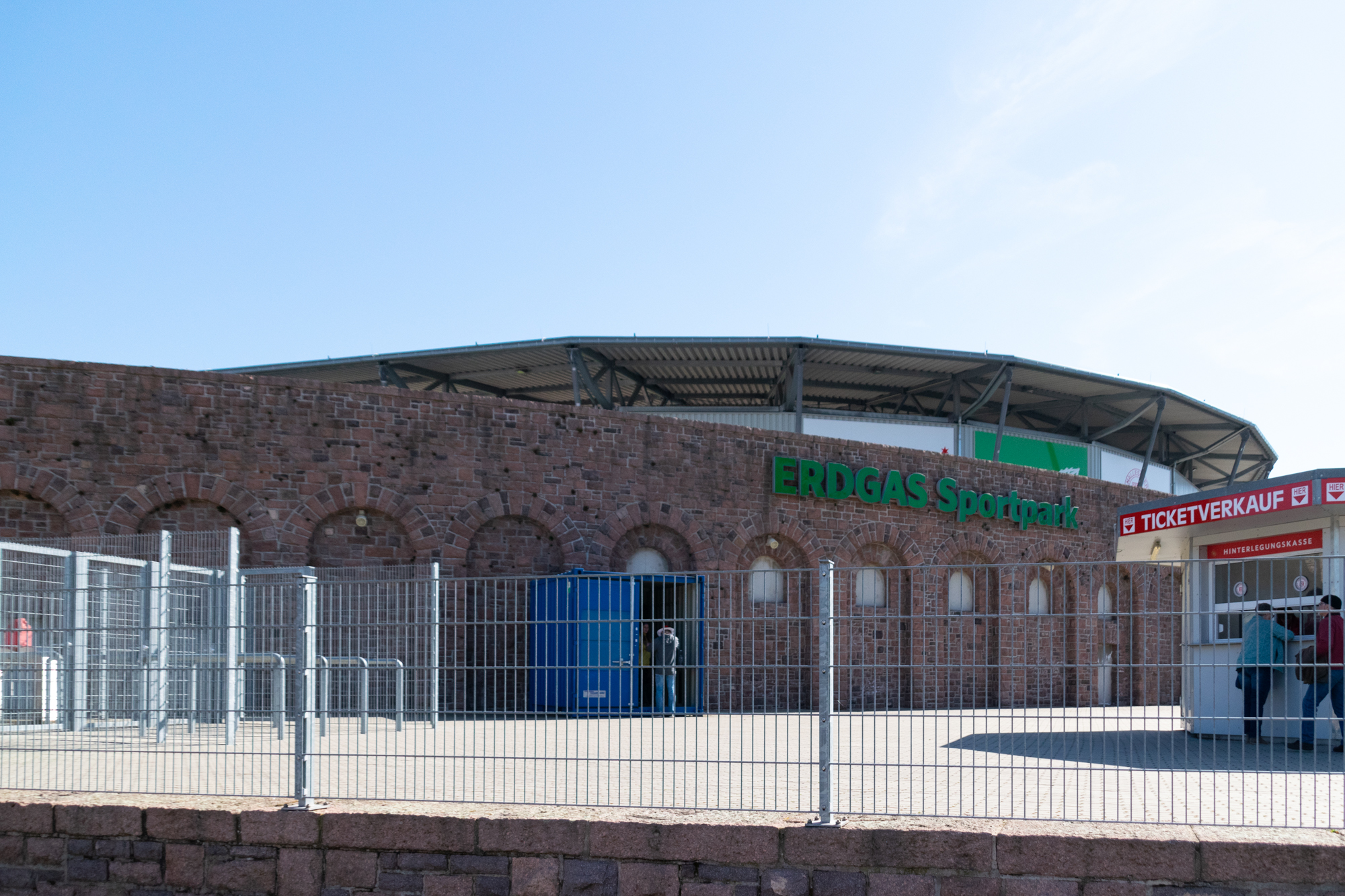
Erdgas Sportpark home of Hallescher FC

The football team Hallescher FC Wacker 1900 had some regional importance before World War II. In the German Championship Wacker reached the semi-finals in 1921, and the quarter-finals in 1928. The successor team became East German champions in 1949 and 1952 under the names of ZSG Union and BSG Turbine Halle. From these evolved today's Turbine Halle and Hallescher FC. In the era of the German Democratic Republic, the latter club (as Chemie Halle ) was a mainstay in the first division and won the Cup tournament in 1956 and 1962. The most prominent player was 72-times international Bernd Bransch, who was with Chemie in the 1960s and 1970s. These days, Hallescher FC usually plays in the third division.

The general sports club SV Halle, originating from Chemie Halle, created a notable number of Olympic gold medallists and world champions, mainly in nautical and watersports, e.g., swimmer Kornelia Ender won four Olympic gold medals in 1976 and Andreas Hajek won four rowing world championships between 1998 and 2001. The basketball team of the club – these days known as Lions and focusing on the woman's team which plays in the national first division – won five men's and 10 women's championships of the German Democratic Republic. The Hallescher FC's location is extremely close to a train station.

== Notable people ==
=== Public service ===
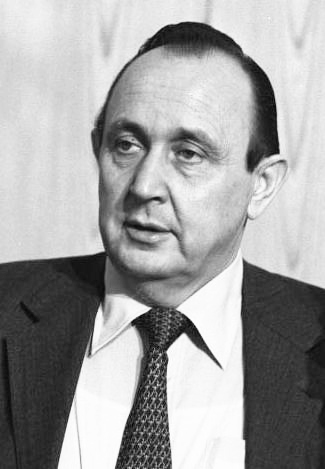
Hans-Dietrich Genscher, 1978

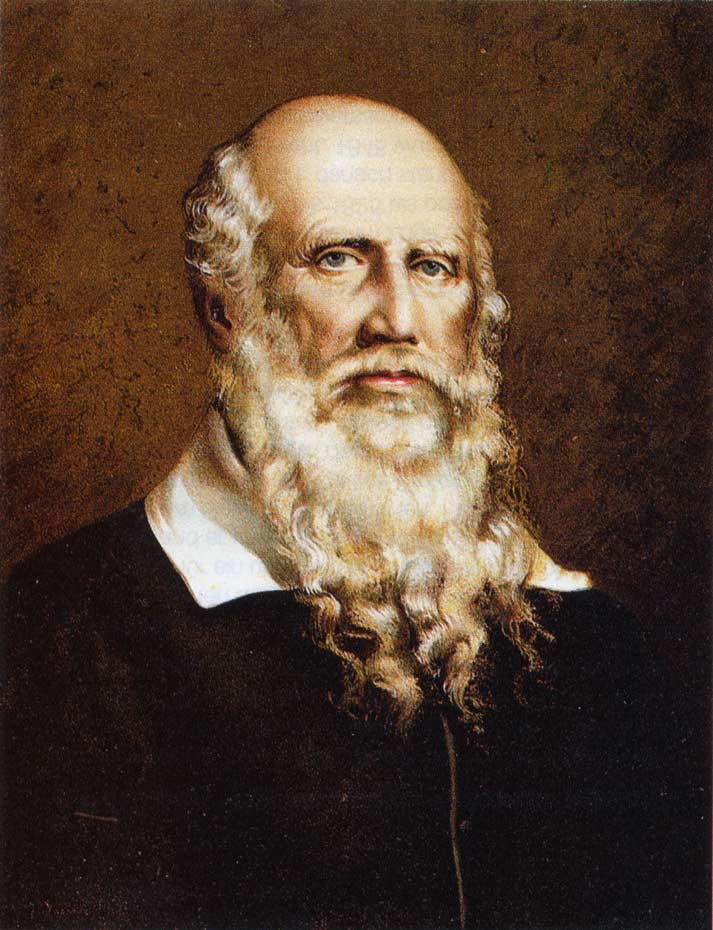
Friedrich Ludwig Jahn, 1852

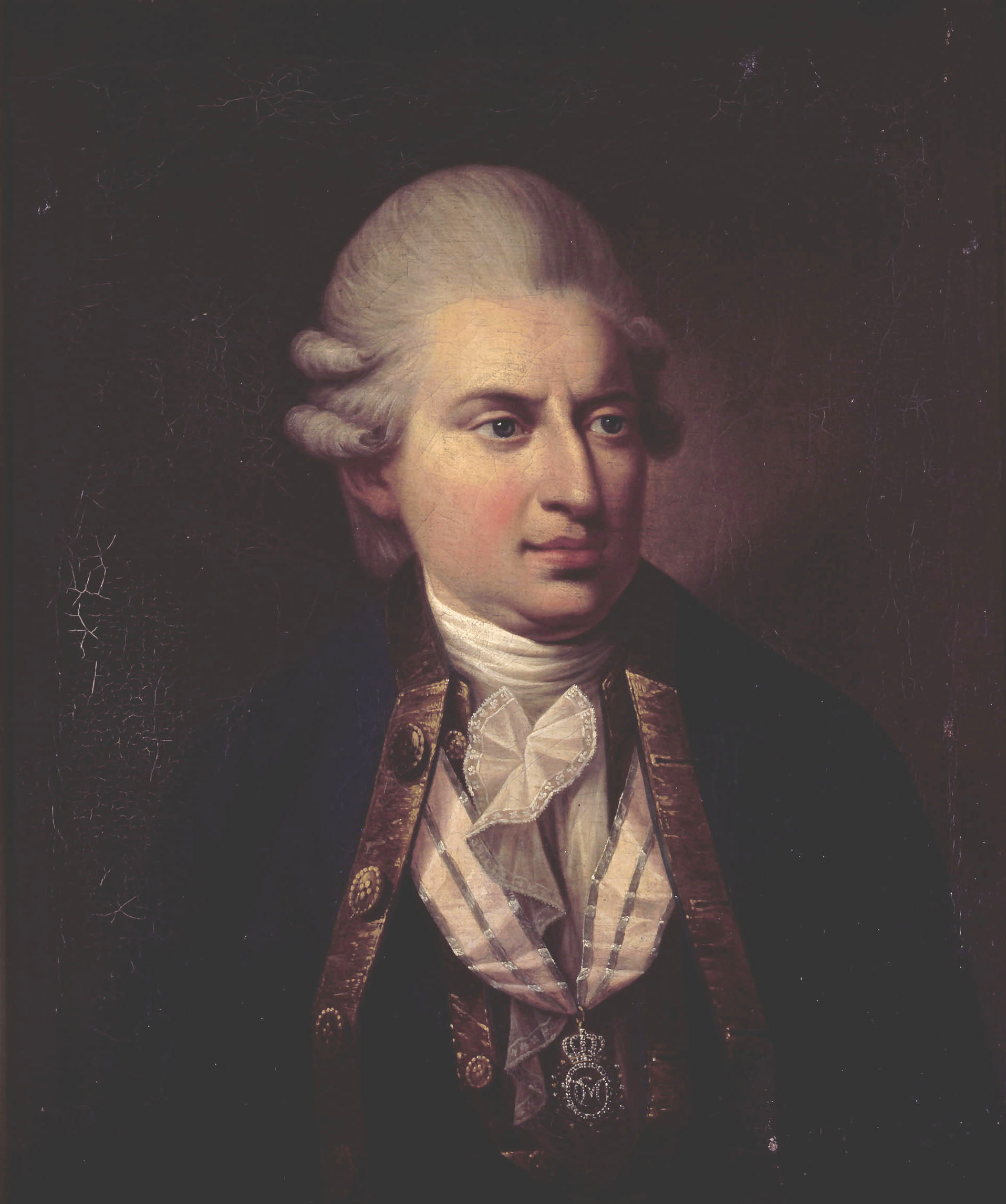
Johann Friedrich Struensee

- Clemens von Delbrück (1856–1921), conservative politician, Vice-Chancellor of Germany 1908–1916
- Helga Einsele (1910–2005), a criminologist, prison director and high-profile prisons reformer.
- Gerhard Feige (born 1951), bishop of the Roman Catholic Diocese of Magdeburg
- August Hermann Francke (1663–1727), Lutheran Pietist theologian at the University of Halle and founder of the Halle Orphan House complex.
- Hans-Dietrich Genscher (1927–2016), former Vice Chancellor and longest serving Foreign Minister, (1974 to 1992), was born in Reideburg, which belongs to Halle today
- Gerald Götting (1923–2015), chairman of the East German Christian Democratic Union, 1966–1989.
- Margot Honecker (1927–2016), First Lady of the German Democratic Republic, 1971–1989
- Friedrich Ludwig Jahn (1778–1852), theology student of University Halle 1796–1800, went into hiding using a porphyry cave along the river Saale. It became known as the "Jahn-Höhle" (Cave).
- Christian Andreas Käsebier (1710–1757), intelligence operative for Frederick the Great, robber and swindler, born and raised in Halle
- Carl Lampert, (1894–1944), priest, beheaded by Nazis in World War II at Halle
- Hans Litten (1903–1938), lawyer, represented opponents of the Nazis at trials from 1929 and 1932
- Johann David Michaelis (1717–1791), a Prussian biblical scholar and teacher.
- Frederick Muhlenberg (1750–1801), the first Speaker of the United States House of Representatives, graduated at Halle University.
- George Müller (1805–1898), preacher and philanthropist, coordinator of orphanages in Bristol.
- Cornelia Pieper (born 1959), a German politician, now German consul general in Gdańsk, Poland.
- Henriette Quade (born 1984), politician
- Richard Raatzsch (born 1957), philosopher and professor of practical philosophy
- Princess Elisabeth Sophie of Saxe-Altenburg (1619–1680), a princess of Saxe-Altenburg
- Fabian von Schlabrendorff (1907–1980), lawyer, officer, judge and member of the German resistance
- Friedrich Daniel Ernst Schleiermacher (1768–1834), university preacher and professor of theology to the University of Halle, where he remained until 1807.
- Fabian von Schlabrendorff (1907–1980), a jurist, soldier and member of the German resistance and judge of the German Federal Constitutional Court.
- Albrecht Schröter (born 1955), politician (SPD) and mayor of Jena from 2006 to 2018.
- Gertrud Schubart-Fikentscher (1896–1985), first female professor of law from 1948 for 17 years
- Ullrich Sierau (born 1956), politician (SPD) and mayor of Dortmund from 2010 to 2020
- John Sigismund, Elector of Brandenburg (1572–1619), a Prince-elector of the Margraviate of Brandenburg
- Hans-Christian Ströbele (born 1939), politician (Greens) and member of the Bundestag
- Johann Friedrich Struensee (1737–1772), a German physician, philosopher and statesman.
- Ľudovít Štúr (1815–1856), Slovak national leader, linguist and writer, studied at the University of Halle in 1838–1840

=== Military ===
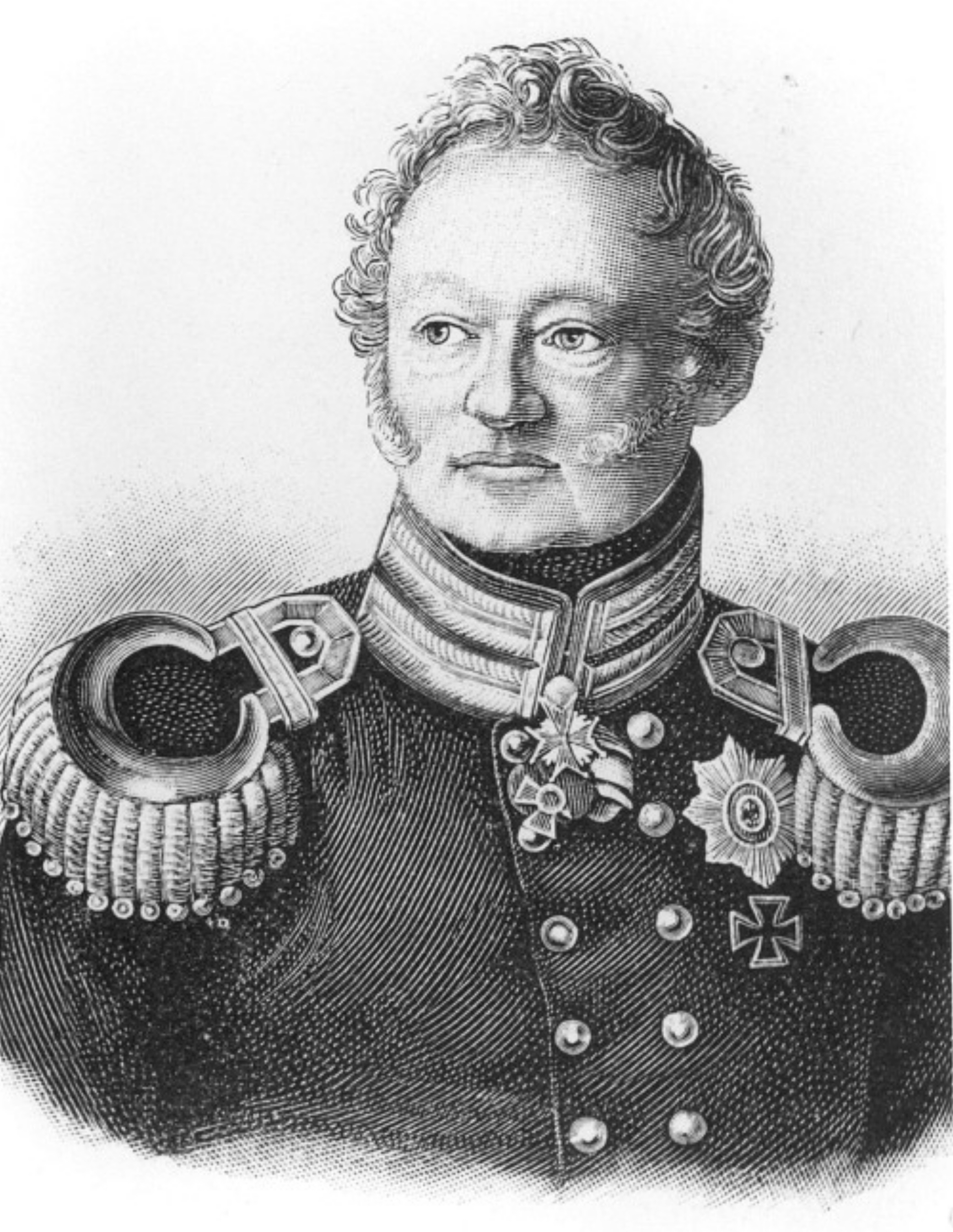
Karl Freiherr von Müffling, pre-1837

- Max von Bahrfeldt (1856–1936), Prussian General, local historian, and world renown numismatist, died here in 1936
- Reinhard Heydrich (1904–1942), a leading Nazi in WWII and a main architect of the Holocaust
- Ludolf von Alvensleben (1901–1970), an SS functionary, fled to Argentina after WWII
- Oswald Boelcke (1891–1916), World War I German flying ace, born near Halle
- Karl von Eberstein (1894–1979), German nobility, early member of the Nazi Party, the SA and the SS.
- Walter Eisfeld (1905–1940), Nazi SS concentration camp commandant
- Paul Götze (1903–1948), Nazi SS officer at Auschwitz and Buchenwald concentration camps executed for war crimes
- Johannes Hassebroek (1910–1977), Nazi SS commandant of Gross-Rosen concentration camp.
- Karl Freiherr von Müffling (1775–1851), Prussian general field marshal.

=== Science ===
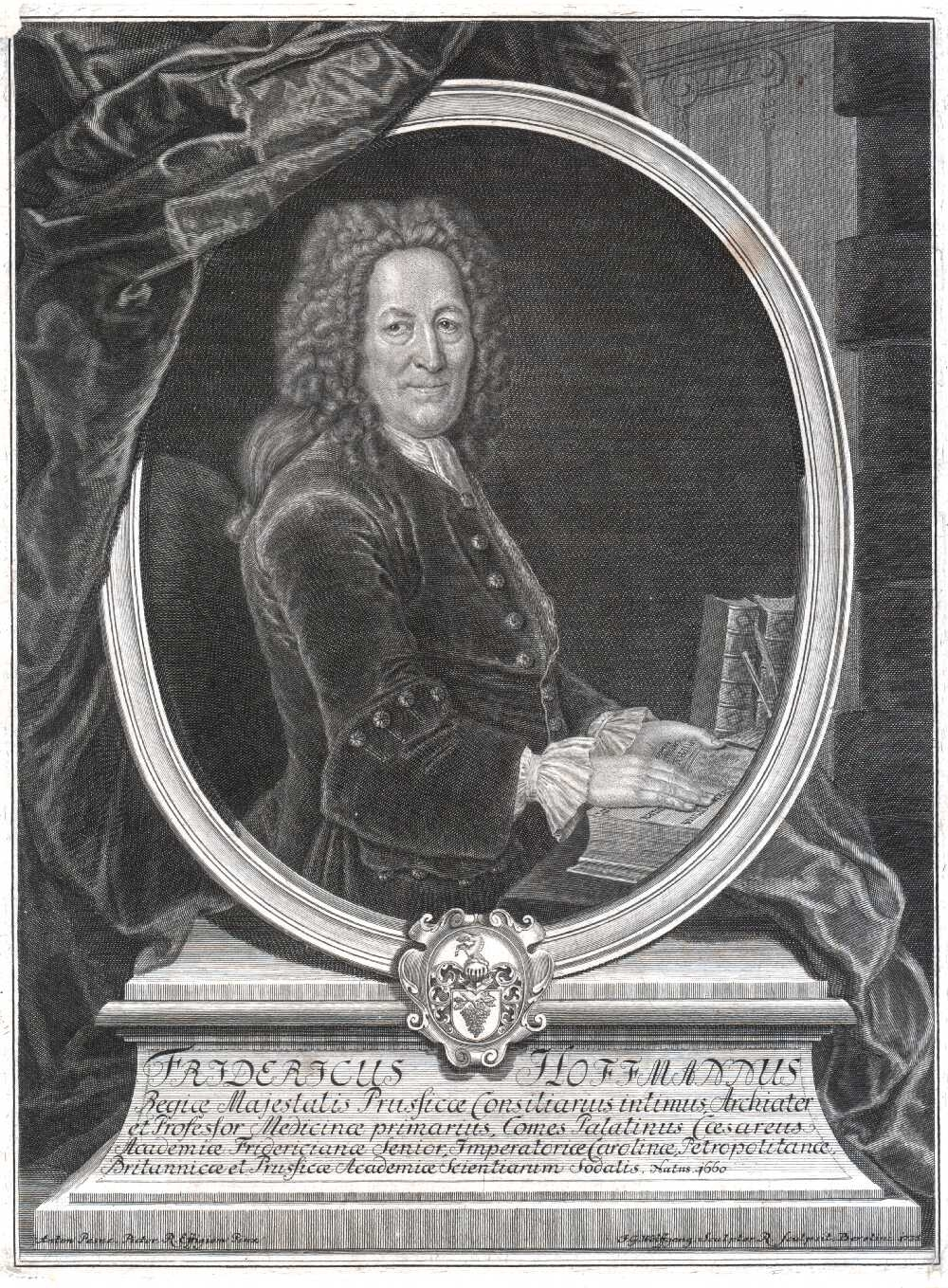
Friedrich Hoffmann

- Bernd Baselt (1934–1993), university professor, published a catalogue leading to the modern day opus designator (HWV) which is used when referring to the works of George Frideric Handel.
- Dorothea Christiane Erxleben of Quedlinburg (1715–1762) received her Doctor of Medicine degree in 1754 from the Medical Department of Martin Luther University (MLU)
- Georg Cantor (1845–1918), mathematician and professor at the university of Halle
- Johann Reinhold Forster (1729–1798), Reformed pastor and naturalist.
- Arthur Golf (1877–1941), an academic agronomist, focussed on colonial agriculture
- Siegwart Horst Günther (1925–2015), a German physician,'father of the anti-uranium-weapons movement in Germany', born in Halle
- Friedrich Hoffmann (1660–1742), a German physician and chemist.
- Christian Knaut (1656–1716), doctor, botanist and librarian
- Andreas Libavius (1550–1616), practised alchemy, wrote the book Alchemia, a chemistry textbook
- Felix Jacob Marchand (1846–1928), a German pathologist, coined the term atherosclerosis
- Leonhard Sohncke (1842–1897), mathematician and professor of physics
- Kurt Polycarp Joachim Sprengel (1766–1833), botanist
- Georg Wilhelm Steller (1709–1746), a botanist, zoologist, physician and explorer of Siberia, Kamchatka and Alaska
- Charles Tanford (1921–2009), American protein chemist, born in Halle as Karl Tannenbaum
- Christian Friedrich von Völkner (1728–1796), German translator and historian in Russia

=== Arts ===
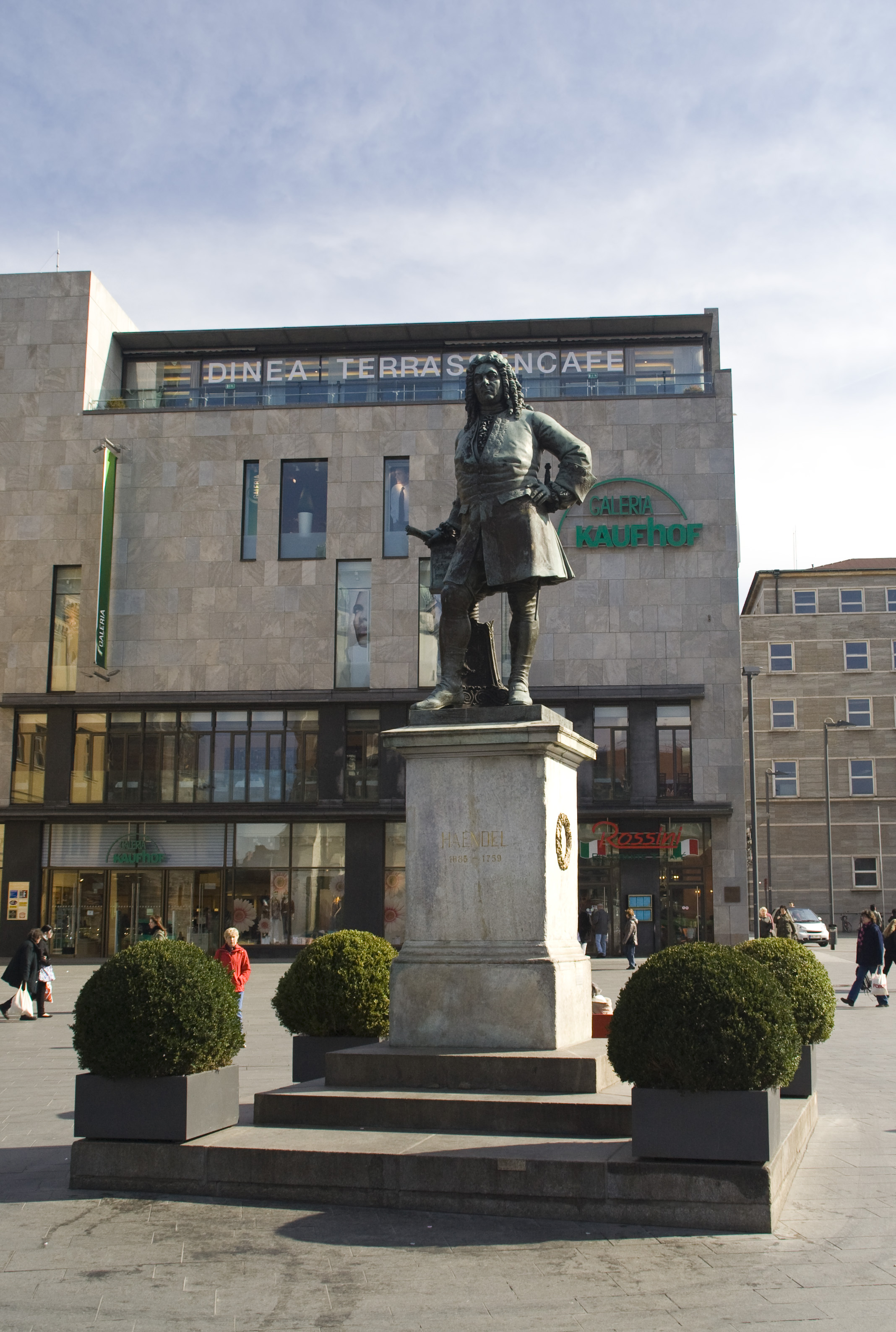
Statue of Georg Friedrich Händel in Market Square, Halle

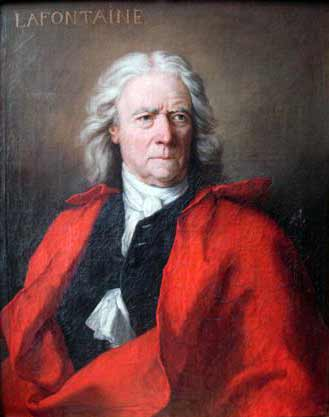
August Lafontaine

- Conny Bauer (born 1943) & Johannes Bauer (1954–2016) jazz trombonists.
- Johann Friedrich Bause (1738–1814), a copper engraver; primarily of portraits.
- Ursula Brömme (1931–2001), operatic soprano
- Thuon Burtevitz (born 1973), composer
- Heinrich Andreas Contius (1708–1795) an organ builder in the Baltic States
- Susanne Daubner (born 1962), German news and television presenter
- Lyonel Feininger (1871–1956), painter of several famous images in Halle, incl. The cathedral in Halle.
- Ernst Flügel (1844–1912), a German Romantic composer.
- Robert Franz (1815–1892), a German composer, mainly of lieder.
- Moritz Götze (born 1964), artist, painter, sculptor, born and lives in Halle
- Georg Friedrich Händel (1685–1759), Baroque composer, born and raised in Halle.
- Carola Helbing-Erben (born 1952), textile artist
- Claire Heliot (1866–1953), a German lion tamer.
- Johann Georg Ludwig Hesekiel (1819–1874), author and journalist.
- Nickel Hoffmann (1536–1592), mastermason, worked over 30 years in Halle, including the Market Church and the Composanto
- August Lafontaine (1758–1831), a writer of sentimental novels, then hugely popular, died in Halle
- Georg Listing (born 1987), bassist from the Magdeburg-based band, Tokio Hotel
- Johann Friedrich Naue (1787–1858), classical composer
- Ursula Noack (1918–1988), a cabaret artiste, film and stage actress and chanson singer
- Kai Pflaume (born 1967), German television presenter, born in Halle
- Johann Friedrich Reichardt (1752–1814), composer, writer and music critic, lived in Halle. He was a close friend of Johann Wolfgang von Goethe
- Therese Albertine Luise Robinson (1797–1870), author and translator. She worked together with Johann Wolfgang von Goethe to translate Vuk Stefanović Karadžić's "Folk songs of the Serbs."
- Samuel Scheidt (1587–1654), Baroque composer and organist, spent most of his life in Halle
- Hellmut Schnackenburg (1902–1974), conductor
- Ina Seidel (1885-1974), lyric poet and novelist
- Daniel Gottlob Türk (1756–1813), classical composer, was born in Halle in 1750, and was a professor at the University of Halle
- Anja Daniela Wagner (born 1969), operatic mezzo-soprano
- Paul Weigel (1867–1951), a German-American actor, appearing in over 110 films between 1916 and 1945.

=== Sport ===
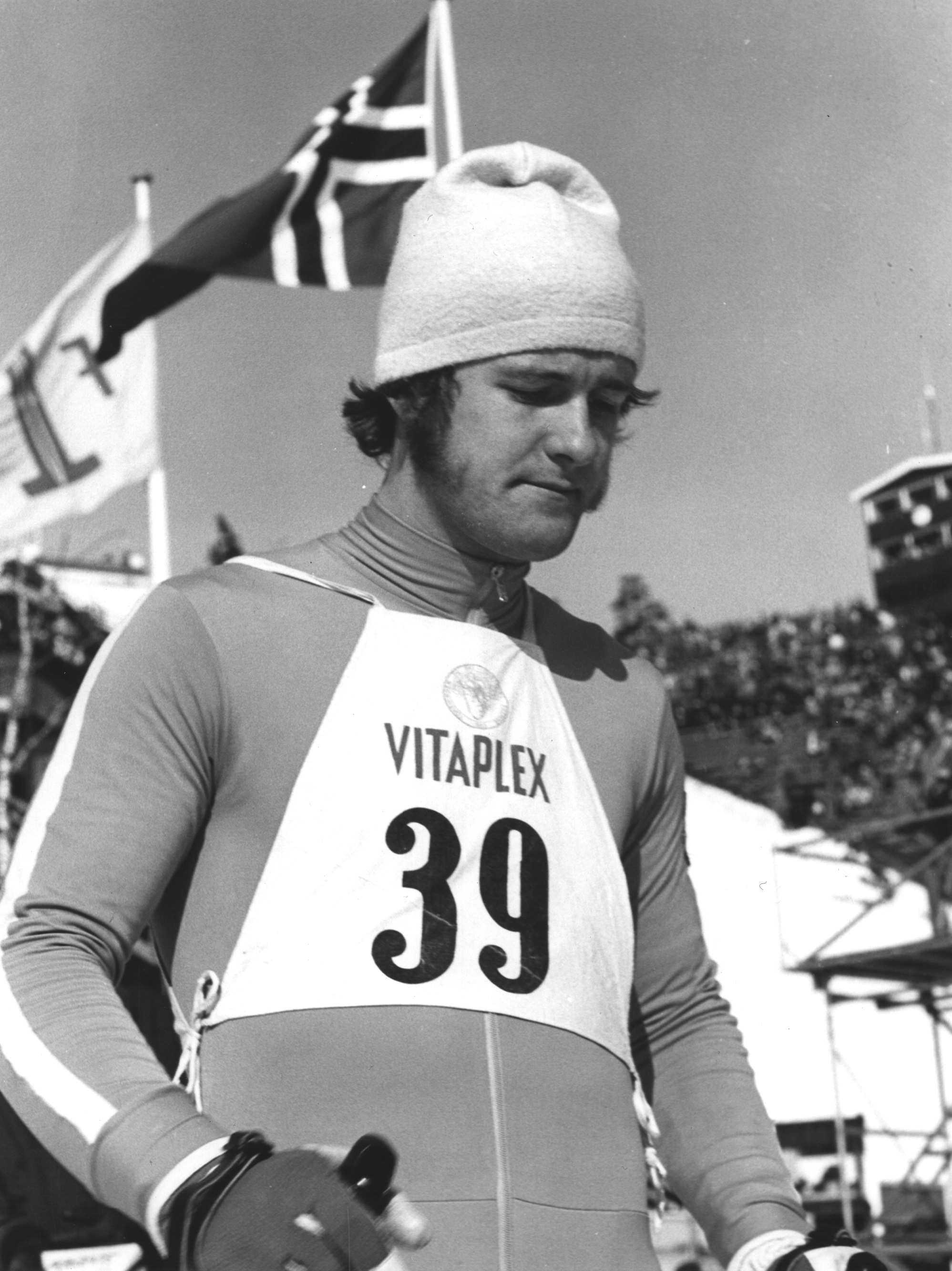
Ulrich Wehling, 1976

- Bernd Bransch (1944–2022), a footballer with 317 club caps and 64 for East Germany
- Waldemar Cierpinski (born 1950), East German athlete and twice Olympic Champion, lives in Halle
- Fritz Huschke von Hanstein (1911–1996), a German racing driver, worked for Porsche
- Yoan Pablo Hernández (born 1984), Cruiserweight boxing champion (immigrated from Cuba)
- Marita Lange (1943–2025), shot putter, silver medallist at the 1968 Summer Olympics
- Lothar Milde (born 1934), East German discus thrower, silver medallist at the 1968 Summer Olympics
- Jochen Pietzsch (born 1963), a former East German luger, he won gold in at the 1988 Winter Olympics and bronze in 1984.
- Conny Pohlers (born 1978), a German former footballer with 67 caps with Germany women
- Torsten Spanneberg (born 1975), an team bronze medal winner in the 4 × 100 m medley relay at the 2000 Summer Olympics
- Andreas Wank (born 1988), German ski jumper, team gold medallist at the 2014 Winter Olympics
- Ulrich Wehling (born 1952), a retired German skier who won the Nordic combined event in the Winter Olympics three consecutive times, in 1972, 1976, and 1980.
- Dariusz Wosz (born 1969), a German football coach and former player with 563 club caps and 17 for Germany

=== Other ===
- Marla-Svenja Liebich (born 1970), German far-right activist

== International relations ==
=== Twin towns – sister cities ===
Halle is twinned with:

- Oulu, Finland (1968)
- Linz, Austria (1975)
- Grenoble, France (1976)
- Ufa, Russia (1977)
- Karlsruhe, Germany (1987)
- Jiaxing, China (2009)
- Savannah, United States (2011)
- Gyumri, Armenia (2023)

=== Friendly cities ===
Halle also has friendly relations with:

- Coimbra, Portugal (1976)
- Hildesheim, Germany (1990)
