= Burg Giebichenstein University of Art and Design =

Arts school in Halle, Germany

- Burg Giebichenstein Kunsthochschule Halle
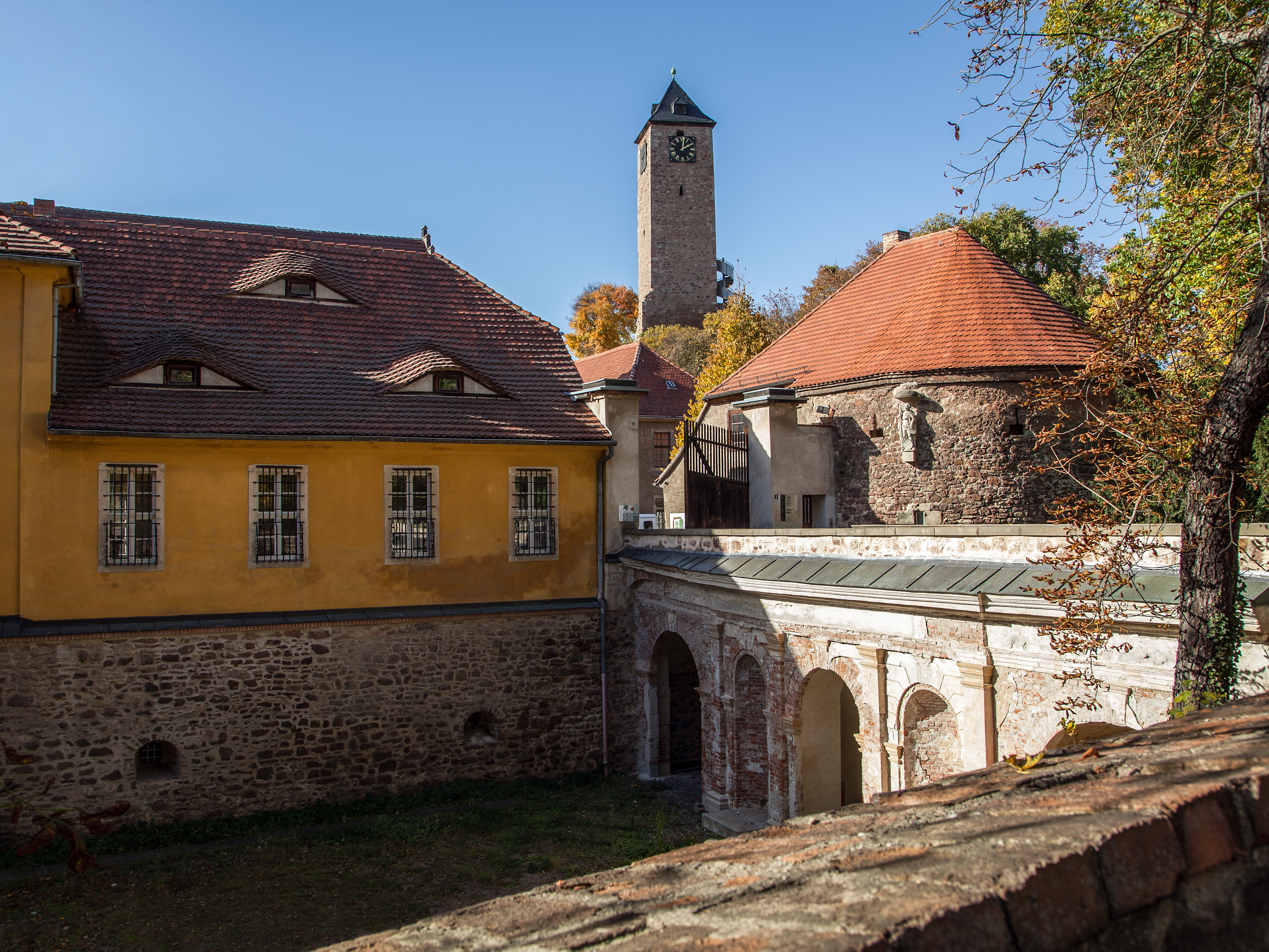
- Established: 1915
- Rector: Dieter Hofmann
- Students: 1039
- Location: Halle (Saale), Saxony-Anhalt, Germany; 51.5027°N 11.9549°E
- Website: www.burg-halle.de

Burg Giebichenstein Kunsthochschule Halle (BURG) is the university of art and design in Halle an der Saale that was established in 1915. With a student body numbering over 1,000, BURG is one of the largest universities of art and design in Germany. It offers 20 art and design degree programmes in two faculties.

BURG is located on the lower fortress of Giebichenstein Castle above the right bank of Saale River on the city's northern border. Part of the Art campus is on the grounds of the former Hermes print finishing company in north-eastern Halle and the rest is combined with the Design campus on Neuwerk to the east of Mühlgraben, the old water channel for the town's mill.

== History and present ==
Today's Burg Giebichenstein University of Art and Design Halle is the successor to the Commercial Draughtsman and Artisan’s School of the city of Halle. That school was established in 1879 when the Provincial Trade School Halle (est. 1852) and the Commercial Draughtsman’s School (est. 1870) merged. Today's university of art and design counts the hour of its birth as 1 July 1915, when the architect, Paul Thiersch, began his term as director. The school's name was Halle School of Artisans and the Applied Arts. Thiersch provided new momentum and reformed the lesson plan in the spirit of the German Association of Craftsmen (Deutscher Werkbund) and the ideal of the master craftsmen who collaborated to build medieval cathedrals. The school was a conglomeration of training and producing workshops and art-related classes who taught students without a fixed curriculum. In addition to a cabinetmaker's workshop, there were classes for painting, graphic design, sculpture, architecture, textile design, and photography.

In 1922, the school moved into rooms in the lower fortress of Giebichenstein Castle, where it became Workshops of the city of Halle, Burg Giebichenstein, the state and municipal school of the applied arts.

After the Bauhaus in Weimar closed in 1925, many former Bauhaus staff came to BURG as teachers, including the sculptor Gerhard Marcks, who held the office of director from 1928 until 1933. After the National Socialists came to power in 1933, Marguerite Friedlaender, Gerhard Marcks, Charles Crodel, and Erwin Hahs were forced to leave the school. The Nazi regime changed the school's remit and allowed it to continue as a centre for education in the crafts.

In the post-second world war period, Burg Giebichenstein was revived as a university of art and design. Under Director Walter Funkat, the foundation for the University for Industrial Design Halle was laid in 1958. Until 1989, it was one of the most influential educational institutions for designers and artists in the GDR. With its educational programme in applied arts, the university was responsible for the particularly artistic quality of the country's applied arts. Between 1965 and 1975, the fine arts were neglected as a discipline in favour of design. BURG did not recover the structure it had in the 1920s until 1975, when several new disciplines were added (glass, media arts, communication design). In 1976, President Paul Jung set up the Theory and Methodology department (under Horst Oehlke and Rolf Frick). In that group, up to 25 academics from a variety of disciplines worked on design methodology and design theory. They also paved the way for using computer technology for design.

The university was re-christened Burg Giebichenstein University of Art and Design Halle in 1989. The university has met the challenges of social change, internationalisation, and the increasing complexity of art and design. BURG's unique selling proposition has traditionally been its strong education in artistic and fundamentals.

The Design campus has been the site of extensive renovation and expansion since 2003 and is the site of the new library that opened its doors in 2015.

Bachelor's courses in the Design faculty were implemented in 2005 and master's courses in 2008. Diplom courses continue to be offered in the Art faculty.

In 2010, the university's name was changed to “art university” in German to underscore the connection between “art school” and “university”. In 2013, the university of art and design was granted the right to confer doctorates. BURG celebrated its 100th anniversary in 2015 with an extensive programme featuring numerous exhibitions, events, and publications.

Currently, around 1,040 students are enrolled at the university. Approximately two-thirds are taking a design course and the remaining one-third study art. Since winter semester 2014/2015, Dieter Hofmann, Professor of Industrial Design/Product and System Design, has been president. In June 2018, he was elected president for a further four years. Of the 51 professorships that are currently occupied (including guest, substitute, and honorary professors), 25 are held by women. This makes the university of art and design one of the few in Germany with a faculty that embraces gender equality.

== Studying at BURG ==
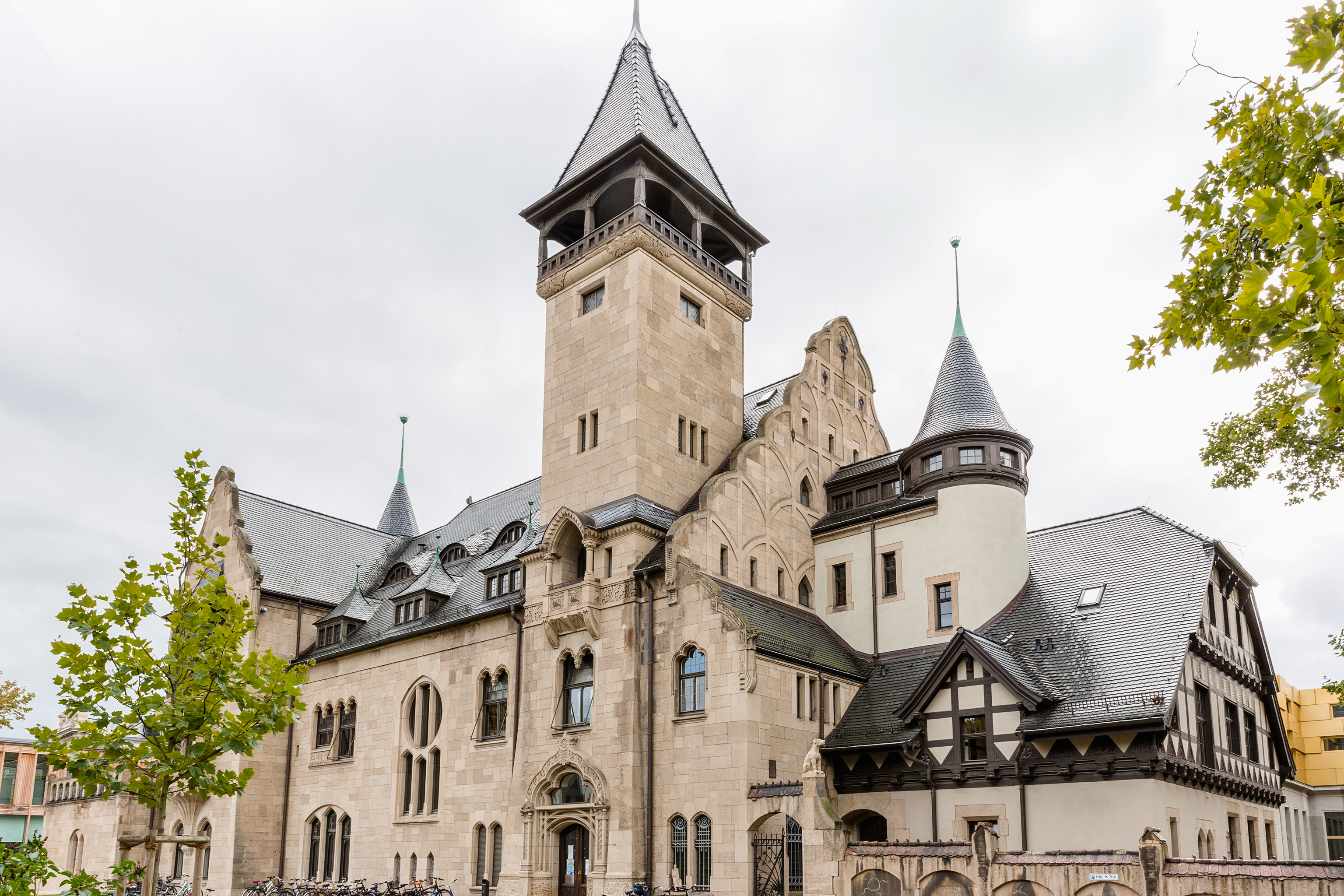
Central administration located on the Design campus

Burg Giebichenstein University of Art and Design Halle has 20 Diplom, bachelor's, and master's courses in two faculties and 15 specialist degree programmes. It also offers two post-graduate programmes and since 2013, has had the right to confer doctorates in design sciences. Fifteen percent of BURG students are foreigners.

Students normally receive a bachelor's degree in four years, a master's degree in one year, and a Diplom in five years. A special focus of the degree programmes at BURG is education in the artistic-academic fundamentals of theory and practice, which are uniformly taught to all students in their first two years at the university. Under specialist supervision, students can use the materials and equipment of over 20 specialist workshops on the university campuses. The entrance exam is held in mid-March every year. On average, 1,480 potential students apply to become part of the given year's cohort of approximately 200.

== Locations ==
Burg Giebichenstein University of Art and Design Halle has three main locations. The Design campus on Neuwerk 7 is one centre of life at BURG. It contains the central administration department, the library, media centre, student information centre, the Designhaus Halle start-up centre, and the central workshops, as well as the Design faculty's classroom buildings. Most of the Art faculty studios and rooms are located on the Art campus on Seebener Straße 1. The lectures for art pedagogy, art (teaching degree), textile arts, and painting take place in the Hermes building on Hermesstrasse 5.

== Public events ==
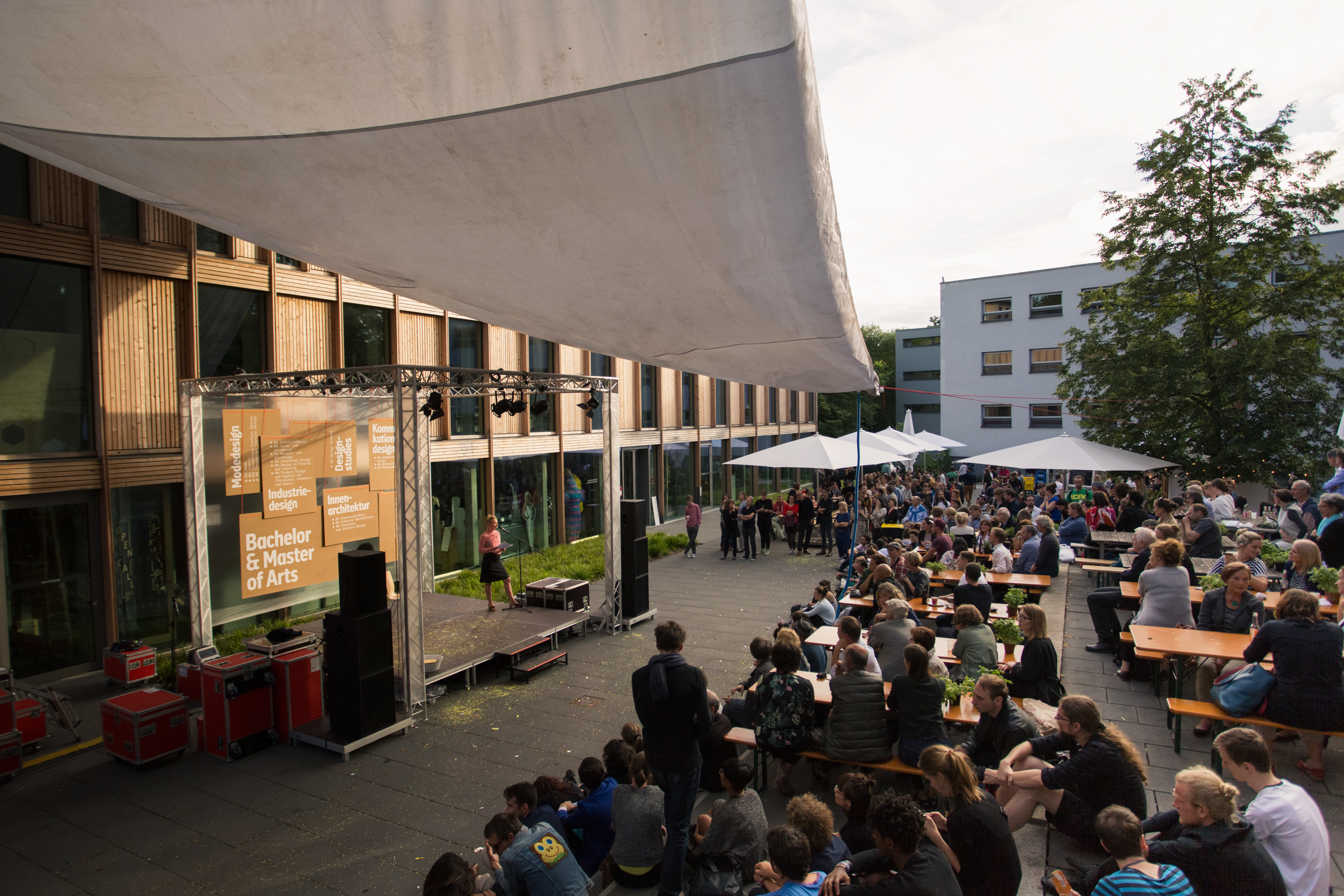
Presentation ceremony during the 2017 annual exhibition

The annual exhibition in July is the climax of the academic year. For an entire weekend, the students of all courses present their semester and thesis work on the Art campus, Design campus, in the Hermes building, and in other exhibition spaces.

And at the end of each semester in July and February, the fashion design students present their collections in a gala fashion show. During the semester, there is a series of exhibitions in the university's own exhibition space: Burg Galerie im Volkspark. The GiebichenStein Design Award ceremony has been the traditional kick-off to the new academic year since 2012. It is accompanied by an exhibition in the Art Foundation of the state of Saxony-Anhalt.

Potential students can receive an impression of the university, receive tips on their portfolios, and participate in tours on Student Information Day, held in January every year.

== Selection of rectors, professors, lecturers and graduates ==
- Caroline Achaintre, mixed media artist, professor
- ATAK (graphic artist), graphic artist, professor
- Hanne Bergius, art historian
- Erich Consemüller, architect, professor
- Charles Crodel, painter and graphic artist
- Ludwig Ehrler, painter, rector
- Rolf Frick, design methodology, professor
- Waldemar Grzimek, sculptor, lecturer
- Hanns Hopp, architect, director
- Rudolf Horn, furniture designer, professor
- Robert Klümpen, painter, professor
- Benita Koch-Otte, textile designer, workshop
- Werner Laux, painter, professor
- Gerhard Marcks, sculptor, rector
- Otto Müller, painter
- Eva Natus-Šalamounová, graphic artist
- Ronald Paris, painter, graphic artist, professor
- Uwe Pfeifer, painter, graphic artist
- Dieter Rex, painter, graphic artist
- Barbara Schmidt, porcelain designer
- Isolde Schmitt-Menzel, designer, illustrator
- Willi Sitte, painter and graphic artist
- Paul Thiersch, architect, director
- Andrea Tinnes, graphic designer, professor
- Gustav Weidanz, sculptor, director
- Marguerite Wildenhain, ceramic artist, lecturer
- Hans Wittwer, architect, lecturer

== International partner universities ==
In Europe, Burg Giebichenstein University of Art and Design Halle maintains official university partnerships with 53 universities in 20 countries. The university of art and design also cooperates with a further 11 international universities of art and design worldwide, with a focus on exchanges with Saint Petersburg (Russia), Havana (Cuba), and Tokyo (Japan). Burg Giebichenstein University of Art and Design Halle is also a partner in the Cumulus association of European universities, a network of 165 art and design universities, and a member of the European League of Institutes of the Arts (ELIA). The partner universities include:

- Aalto University, Helsinki, Finland
- Academy of Arts, Architecture and Design Prague, Prague, Czech Republic
- Academy of Fine Arts Vienna, Vienna, Austria
- Bezalel Academy of Arts and Design, Jerusalem, Israel
- Design Academy Eindhoven, Eindhoven, Netherlands
- Free University of Bozen-Bolzano, Bozen, Italy
- Instituto Superior de Arte, Havana, Cuba
- Instituto Superior de Diseño Industrial, Havana, Cuba
- Seoul National University, Seoul, South Korea
- Saint Petersburg Art and Industry Academy, Saint Petersburg, Russia
- The Royal Danish Academy of Fine Arts Copenhagen, Denmark
- Tokyo University of the Arts, Tokyo, Japan
- University of Gothenburg, Gothenburg, Sweden
- University of Leeds, Leeds, Great Britain
- Zürcher Hochschule der Künste, Zurich, Switzerland
