= List of people from Aachen =

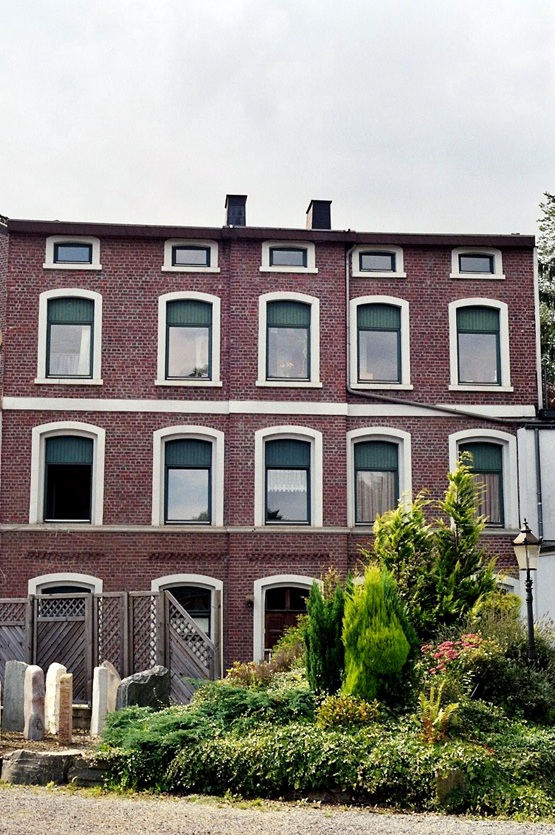
House of the family of the "founding father" of modern architecture, Mies van der Rohe

This is a list of people from Aachen, alternatively known as Bad Aachen and Aix-la-Chapelle, arranged by date.

== Pre 13th century ==
- Charlemagne (748–814), also known as Charles the Great, moved to Aachen and made it the capital of his empire
- Æthelwulf (–858), king of Wessex, and father of Alfred the Great, was born in Aachen while his father, Egbert, was in exile at Charlemagne's court.

== 13th–17th century ==
- Theobald Craschel (1511–1587), auxiliary bishop in Cologne

== 18th century ==
- Isabelle Brunelle (1724–1805), refugee and philanthropist
- Johann Joseph Couven (1701–1763), architect and builder

== 1800–1820 ==
- Adam Eberle (1804–1832), history painter and lithographer of the romance
- Friedrich Thyssen (1804–1877), banker
- Johannes Theodor Laurent (1804–1884), Apostolic Vicar of Luxemburg
- Alfred von Reumont (1808–1887), statesman and historian
- Henri Victor Regnault (1810–1878), French physicist and chemist
- Arnold Foerster (1810–1884), botanist and entomologist
- Peter Ludwig Kuhnen (1812–1877), landscape painter of the Romantic
- Mary Frances Schervier (1819–1876), founder of the Poor Sisters of St. Francis

== 1821–1840 ==
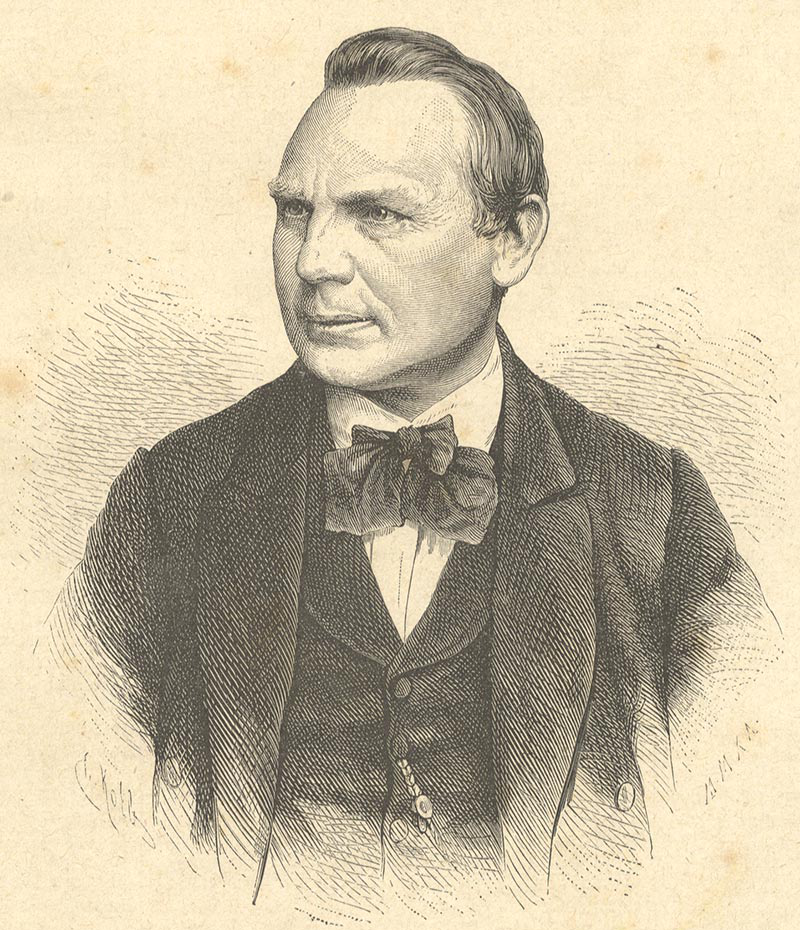
Joseph Hubert Reinkens 1874

- Joseph Hubert Reinkens (1821–1896), Old Catholic Church bishop and theologian
- Franz Bock (1823–1899), canon and art historian
- Adolph von Hansemann (1826–1903), entrepreneur and banker
- Adolph Sutro (1830–1898), mayor of San Francisco
- Adam Bock (1832–1912), politician
- Albert Baur (1835–1906), German painter
- Anton Anno (1838–1893), German theatre actor, theatre director, and playwright

== 1841–1860 ==
- Ludwig von Pastor (1854–1928), historian and Austrian diplomat

== 1861–1880 ==
- Arthur Kampf (1864–1950), history painter and university professor
- Arthur Eichengrün (1867–1949), chemist and university lecturer
- Friedrich Pützer (1871–1922), architect, Protestant church architect and university lecturer
- Gottfried Hinze (1873–1953), 1st Chairman of the German Football Association
- Heinrich Hubert Houben (1875–1935), literary critic and journalist

== 1881–1900 ==
- Ilse Essers (1898–1994), aeronautical engineer
- Wilhelm Worringer (1881–1965), art historian
- Hugo Werner-Kahle (1882–1961), actor
- Hanns Bolz (1885–1918), painter, sculptor and illustrator
- Emil Fahrenkamp (1885–1966), architect, university professor and director of Düsseldorf Art Academy
- Ludwig Mies van der Rohe (1886–1969), architect
- Adam Kuckhoff (1887–1943), writer and resistance fighter against Nazism
- Walter Grotrian (1890–1954), astronomer and astrophysicist
- Walter Hasenclever (1890–1940), writer
- Hans Freiherr von Funck (1891–1979), an officer
- Edgar André (1894–1936), politician
- Alfred Gottschalk (1894–1973), biochemist
- Heinrich Maria Davringhausen (1894–1970), painter
- Hans Croon (1896–1977), a textile manufacturer and president of the IHK Aachen
- Edith Frank (1900–1945), mother to Anne Frank, was born in Aachen

== 1901–1910 ==
- Robert Ritter (1901–1951), Nazi racial theorist
- Leonhard Drach (1903–1996), jurist and war criminal
- Carl Schneider (1905–1975), painter and university professor
- Helmuth Gericke (1909–2007), mathematician and historian of mathematics
- Hans Ernst Schneider alias Hans Schwerte (1909/10–1999), SS-Hauptsturmführer and literary scholar

== 1911–1920 ==
- Friedrich Hendrix (1911–1941), athlete
- Bert Heller (1912–1970), painter
- Fredy Hirsch (1916–1944) German Jewish youth movement leader known for helping children during the Holocaust
- Karl Otto Götz (b. 1914), the main representative of abstract art and Informel in Germany

== 1921–1930 ==
- Claus Helmut Drese (1922–2011), opera and theatre director, writer
- Max Imdahl (1925–1988), art historian
- Otto Graf Lambsdorff (1926–2009), politician (FDP)

== 1931–1940 ==
- Heiner Ruland (1934–2017), composer and music therapist
- Gerd Heinz (born 1940), stage, film and television actor, stage director and theatre manager
- Horst H. Baumann (1934–2019), artist, designer and photographer
- Kurt Malangré (1934–2018), politician
- Paul Theissen (born 1937), pianist, conductor and choirmaster
- Wolf Kahlen (born 1940), video pioneer and performance, object and media artist

== 1941–1950 ==
- Manfred Schell (born 1943), trade unionist and politician
- Raymund Havenith (1947–1993), pianist and university lecturer
- Paul Lovens (born 1949), drummer
- Ulla Schmidt (born 1949), politician
- Hermann Bühlbecker (born 1950), entrepreneur
- Franz Josef Radermacher (born 1950), professor of computer science

== 1951–1960 ==
- Gisela Burckhardt (born 1951), human rights activist
- Udo Dahmen (born 1951), drummer, managing director of the Pop Academy Baden-Württemberg and music lecturer
- Léo Apotheker (born 1953), manager, SAP
- Matthias Frings (born 1953), journalist, television presenter and writer
- Karl Del'Haye (born 1955), football player
- Bascha Mika (born 1954) is a German journalist and publicist
- Isabel Pfeiffer-Poensgen (born 1954), politician
- Thomas Springel (born 1959), handball player
- Sabine Wils (born 1959), politician

== 1960-2000 ==
- Sabina Classen (born 1963), thrash metal singer of the band Holy Moses, was born in Aachen
- Michael Reisch (born 1964), artist and photographer, was born in Aachen
- Uli Kusch (born 1967), a worldwide recognized metal drummer, was born in Aachen
- Kool Savas (born 1975), musician and rapper
- Gracht, Heiko Andreas von der, German economist, futurist, and non-fiction author, was born in Aachen
- Hendrik Schmitz (born 1978), German politician
- David Garrett (born 1980), a world-famous violinist, was born in Aachen.
- Katrin Heß (born 1985), actress and model
- Kai Havertz (born 1999), German professional footballer who plays for Premier League club Arsenal F.C. and the Germany national team.
