= Reisch =

Reisch is a surname, and may refer to:

- Agnes Reisch, German ski jumper
- Cheri Toalson Reisch, American politician
- Gregor Reisch (c.1467–1525), Carthusian humanist writer
- Günter Reisch, German film director
- Harold Reisch, American politician from Missouri
- Lucia A. Reisch, German behavioural economist and social scientist
- Max Reisch (1912–1985), Austrian long-distance motorcyclist and author
- Michael Reisch (born 1964), German artist and photographer
- Stefan Reisch (born 1941), German footballer
- Walter Reisch, Austrian director and screenwriter

== See also ==
- Reisch Beer
