= Franz Anton Schiefner =

Baltic German linguist and tibetologist

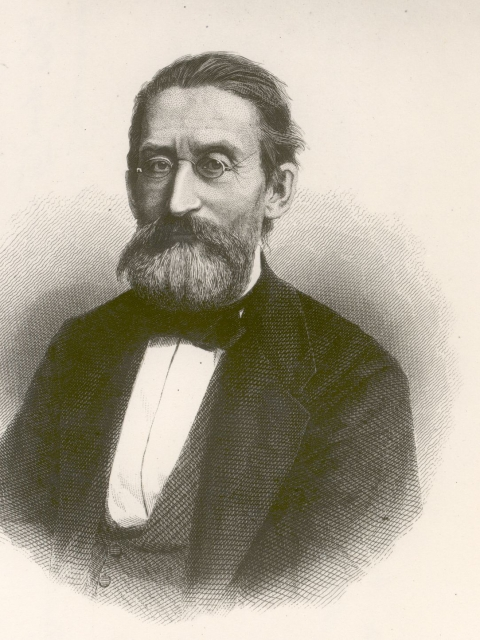
- Born: June 18, 1817; Reval, Russian Empire
- Died: November 16, 1879 (aged 62); Saint Petersburg, Russian Empire
- Occupations: Linguist and tibetologist

Franz Anton Schiefner (June 18, 1817 – November 16, 1879) was a Baltic German linguist and tibetologist.

Schiefner was born to a German-speaking family in Reval (Tallinn), Estonia, then part of Russian Empire. His father was a merchant who had emigrated from Bohemia. He was educated first at the Reval grammar school, matriculated at St Petersburg as a law student in 1836, and subsequently at Berlin, from 1840 to 1842, where he devoted himself exclusively to studies of Eastern languages. On his return to St Petersburg in 1843 he taught classics in the First Grammar School, and soon afterwards received a post in the Imperial Academy, where in 1852 the cultivation of the Tibetan language and literature was assigned to him as a special function. From 1860 to 1873 he simultaneously held the professorship of classical languages in the Saint Petersburg Roman Catholic Theological Academy. From 1854 until his death he was an extraordinary member of the Imperial Academy. He visited England three times for purposes of research in 1863, 1865 and 1878.

Schiefner made his mark in literary research in three directions. First, he contributed to the Memoirs and Bulletin of the St Petersburg Academy, and brought out independently a number of valuable articles and larger publications on the language and literature of Tibet. He possessed also a remarkable acquaintance with the Mongolian language, and when death overtook him had just finished a revision of the New Testament in that language with which the British and Foreign Bible Society had entrusted him.

Further, he was one of the greatest authorities on the philology and ethnology of the Finnic languages. He edited and translated the great Finnish epic Kalevala into German; he arranged, completed and brought out in twelve volumes the literary remains of Matthias Alexander Castrén, bearing on the languages of the Samoyedic tribes, the Koibal, Karagas, Tungusic, Buryat, Ostyak and Kottic tongues, and prepared several valuable papers on Finnic mythology for the Imperial Academy.

In the third place, he investigated the languages of the Caucasus, which his lucid analyses placed within reach of European philologists. Thus he gave a full analysis of the Tush language, and in quick succession, from Baron Peter von Uslar's investigations, comprehensive papers on the Avar, Udi, Abkhaz, Chechen, Kasi-Kumuk, and Hyrcanian languages. He had also mastered Ossetic, and brought out a number of translations from that language, several of them accompanied by the original text.

He died in Saint Petersburg.

== Works ==
- 133 Ehstnische Märchen. Aufgezeichnet von Friedrich Kreutzwald. Aus dem Ehstnischen übersetzt von F. Löwe, ehem. Bibliothekar a. d. Petersb. Akad. d. Wissenschaften. Nebst einem Vorwort von Anton Schiefner und Anmerkungen von Reinhold Köhler und Anton Schiefner. Halle: Verlag der Buchhandlung des Waisenhauses 1869. VIII, 365 S.; 1 S. Berichtigungen und Zusätze. Vorwort, S. IV gez.: St. Petersburg, den 8. (20.) Februar 1869. [Ergänzend dazu:] Estnische Märchen. Aufgezeichnet von Friedrich Kreutzwald. Aus dem Estnischen übersetzt von F. Löwe, ehem. Bibliothekar a. d. Petersb. Akademie der Wissenschaften, corresp. Mitglied der gelehrten esthnischen Gesellschaft zu Dorpat. Zweite Hälfte. Dorpat: C. Mattiesen 1881. IV, 178 S.
- 134 Des Missionars Jäschke Bemühungen um die Erlangung einer Handschrift der Gesar, von A. Schiefner. (Lu le 19 novembre 1868.) Bulletin de l'Academie imperiale des sciences de St. Petersbourg 13.1869, Sp. 476-484 19 November/ 1 December 1868. Melanges asiatiques 6.1873, 1-12
- 135 Täranätha's Geschichte des Buddhismus in Indien. Aus dem Tibetischen übersetzt von Anton Schiefner. St. Petersburg: Kais. Akademie der Wissenschaften 1869. XII, 346 S. S.345-346: Berichtigungen Widmung: Der Ritter- und Domschule zu Reval zur Feier ihres fünfhundert-undfünzigjährigen Bestehens von ihrem dankbaren Schüler. Vorwort, X, gez.: St. Petersburg, 27. Mai (8. Juni) 1869.
- 136 Herrn Professor Wassiljew's Vorrede zu seiner russischen Übersetzung von Täranätha's Geschichte des Buddhismus in Indien, deutsch mitgetheilt von A. Schiefner. Nachtrag zu der deutschen Übersetzung Täranäthas's. St. Petersburg: Kaiserliche Akademie der Wissenschaften 1869. 32 S. Vorw. S. 6 gez.: St. Petersburg, den 30. September (12. October) 1869.
- 137 Über einige morgenländische Fassungen der Rhampsinit-Sage. Von A. Schiefner. (Lu le 11 mars 1869.) Bulletin de l'Academie imperiale des sciences de St. Petersbourg 14.1870, Sp. 299-316 11/23 März 1869. Mel. asiat. 6.1873, 161-186
- 138 Ausführlicher Bericht über Baron P. v. Uslar's Hürkanische Studien. Von A. Schiefner, Mitgliede der Akademie. Gelesen den 1. December 1870. St. Petersburg: Academie imperiale des sciences 1871. IV, 200 S. (Memoires de l'Academie imperiale des Sciences de St.-Petersbourg, VII ser., t. XVII, Nr 8) Vorwort, IV, gez.: Den 26. October / 7. November 1871. A. Schiefner
- 139 Bericht über eine im Sommer 1870 unternommene Reise. Von A. Schiefner. (Lu le 6 octobre 1870.) Bulletin de l'Academie imperiale des sciences de St. Petersbourg 15.1871, Sp. 397-403 6/18 October 1870. Mel. asiat. 6.1873, 287-295
- 140 Beiträge zur Kenntniss der jukagirischen Sprache. Von A. Schiefner. Bulletin de l'Academie imperiale des sciences de St. Petersbourg 15.1871, Sp. 373-399 16/28 Februar 1871. Melanges asiatiques 6.1873, 409-446
- 141 Über Baron Gerhard von Maydells jukagirische Sprachproben. Von A. Schiefner. Bulletin de l'Academie imperiale des sciences de St. Petersbourg 15.1871, Sp. 86-103 28 September /10 October 1871. Melanges asiatiques 6.1873, 600-626
- 142 Ausführlicher Bericht über Baron P. v. Uslar's awarische Studien. Von A. Schiefner, Mitgliede der Akademie. Gelesen den 7. September 1871. St. Petersburg 1872. VIII, 180 S. (Memoires de l'Academie imperiale des Sciences de St.-Petersbourg, VII sei., t. XVIII, Nr 6)
- 143 Ausführlicher Bericht über Baron P. v. Uslar's kürinische Studien. Von A. Schiefner. Der Akademie vorgelegt am 3. October 1872. St. Petersbourg: Academie imperiale des sciences 1873. IV, 256 S. (Memoires de l'Academie imperiale des Sciences de St.-Petersbourg, VII ser., t. XVIII, Nr 2) Vorwort, IV, gez.: St. Petersbourg, den 12/24. September 1873. A. Schiefner S. 255-256
- 144 Awarische Texte. Herausgegeben von A. Schiefner, Mitgliede der Akademie. (Lu le 15 fevrier 1872.) St. Petersburg: Kaiserliche Akademie der Wissenschaften 1873. L, 113 S. (Memoires de l'Academie imperiale des Sciences de St.-Petersbourg, VII ser.,t. XIX, Nr 6) Rez.: Revue critique 8.1874, II, 1-3 (G. P.)
- 145 Leopold Radioff's Wörterbuch der Kinai-Sprache. Herausgegeben von A. Schiefner. (Lu le 5 mars 1874.) St. Petersbourg: Academie imperiale des sciences 1874. X, 33 S. (Memoires de l'Academie imperiale des Sciences de St.-Petersbourg, VII ser., t. XXI, Nr 8) X, gez.: St. Petersburg, den 6. (18.) Mai 1874. A. Schiefner.
- 146 Baron Gerhard von Maydell's Tungusische Sprachproben. Mitgetheilt von A. Schiefner. (Lu le 14 mai 1874.) Bulletin de l'Academie imperiale des sciences de St. Petersbourg 20.1875, Sp. 209-246 14 / 26 Mai 1874. Melanges asiatiques 7.1873/76, 323-377
- 147 Tungusische Miscellen. Von A. Schiefner. (Lu 15 octobre 1874.) Bulletin de l'Academie imperiale des sciences de St. Petersbourg 20.1875:2, Sp. 247-257 15/27 October. Melanges asiatiques 7.1873/76, 378-394
- 148 Zur buddhistischen Apokalyptik. Von A. Schiefner. (Lu le 3 decembre 1874.) Bulletin de l'Academie imperiale des sciences de St. Petersbourg 20.1875, Sp. 379-387 3 /15 December 1874. Melanges asiatiques. 7.1873/76,416-428
- 149 Bharatae responsa tibetice cum versione Latina ab Antonio Schiefner edita. Viro illustrissimo Victori Bouniakowsky Imperialis Academiae Scientiarum Petropolitanae praesidis vices geranti diem XIX (XXXI) mensis Maii A. MDCCCLXXV quo die ante hos quinquaginta annos matheseos doctor ab Academia parisiensi renunciatus est venerabunda gratulatur Imperialis Academiae Scientiarum Petropolitanae classis historico-philologica. Petropoli, typis Imperialis Academiae Scientiarum MDCCCLXX. IV, 46 S. 4° IV gez.: Petropolidie 4(16) mensis Maii 1875. Rez.: Jenaer Literaturzeitung 2.1875,423 (D. D. Whitney)
- 150 [Rez.] Fu pen hing tsi king. The romantic legend of Säkya Buddha: from the Chinese-Sanskrit. By Samuel Beal. London: Trübner & Comp. 1875. XII, 395 S. Jenaer Literaturzeitung 1875:24, S. 423 ff.
- 151 Mahäkätjäjana und König Tshanda-Pradjota. Ein Cyclus buddhistischer Erzählungen. Mitgetheilt von A. Schiefner. (Lu le 2 Septembre 1875.) St. Petersburg 1875. VIII, 67 S. (Memoires, VII ser., t. XXII, Nr 7) Vorwort, VIII, gez.: St. Petersburg, den 19 (29.) October 1875.
- 152 Indische Künstleranekdoten. Von A. Schiefner (Lu le 25 novembre 1875.) Bulletin de l'Academie imperiale des sciences de St. Petersbourg 21.1876, Sp. 193-197 25 Novembre / 7 Decembre 1875. Melanges asiatiques 7.1873/76, 519-525
- 153 Indische Erzählungen. [1-47.] Bulletin de l'Academie imperiale des sciences de St. Petersbourg 21.1876, Sp. 433-493 (Lu le 17 fevrier 1876.); 22.1877, Sp. 123-138; 23.1877, Sp. 1-70, 529-565; 24.1878, Sp. 449-508 (Lu le 18 octobre 1877) Dass.: Melanges asiatiques 7.1876, 673-760, 773-795; 8.1876/81, 89-188, 281-333,449-534
- 154 Über Pluralbezeichnungen im Tibetischen. Von A. Schiefner. (Lu le 20 septembre 1877.) St. Petersburg: Academie imp. des sciences 1877. 17 S. (Memoires de 1'Academie imperiale des sciences de St. Petersbourg, VII ser., t.XXV,Nrl)
- 155 Alexander Czekanowski's Tungusisches Wörterverzeichniss. Herausgegeben von A. Schiefner. (Lu le 26 avril 1877.) Bulletin de l'Academie imperiale des sciences de St. Petersbourg 24.1878, Sp.89-146 26 Avril / 8 Mai 1877. Melanges asiatiques 8.1881, 335-416
- 156 Über Vasubandhu's Gäthäsamgraha. Von A. Schiefner. (Lu le 3 avril 1878.) Bulletin de l'Academie imperiale des sciences de St. Petersbourg 25.1879, Sp. 69-94 3/15 Avril 1878. Melanges asiatiques 8.1876/81, 559-593
- 157 Über eine tibetische Handschrift des India Office in London von A. Schiefner. (Lu le 23 janvier 1879.) Bulletin de l'Academie imperiale des sciences de St. Petersbourg 25.1879, Sp. 321-333

23 Janvier / 4 Fevrier. Melanges asiatiques 8.1881, 623-640

- 158a The languages of the Caucasus. Transactions of the Philological Society 1877-8-9. London, Strasburg 1879, 593-602
- 158 Über das Bonpo-Sütra: «Das weisse Näga-Hunderttausend.» Von A. Schiefner. (Lu le 18 Septembre 1879.) St. Petersbourg: Academie Imperiale des Sciences 1880. IV, 86 S. (Memoires de l'Academie imperiale des Sciences de St.-Petersbourg VII ser., t. XXVIII, Nr 1) Vorwort, IV, gez.: St. Petersburg, den 15. September 1880. W. Grube
- 159 Tibetan tales derived from Indian sources. Translated from the Tibetan of the Kahgyur by F. Anton von Schiefner, and from the German into English by W. R. S. Ralston, M.A. With an introduction. New edition with a preface by C. A. F. Rhys Davids, D.Litt., M.A. London: Trübner & Co. 1882. XV, 368 S. (Trübner's Oriental series.)
- 160 Kalewala, das National-Epos der Finnen, nach der zweiten Ausgabe ins Deutsche übertragen von Anton Schiefner. München: Georg Müller Verlag 1914. VIII, 482 S.
- 161 Kalewala, das National-Epos der Finnen. Übertragung von Anton Schief ner. Bearbeitet und durch Anmerkungen und eine Einführung ergänzt von Martin Buber. 3. Tausend. München: Meyer & Jessen Verlag [1922 ?]. XX, 355 S. OHLdr Vorwort zu dieser Ausgabe, [V] gez.: Heppenheim an der Bergstraße, Ende 1921. Martin Buber.
- 162 Tibetanische Märchen. In das Deutsche übertragen von Maria Leitner. 1.-3. Tsd. Berlin: Juncker Verlag (1923). 224 S. [Übersetzungen von I. J. Schmidt, A. Schiefner, gekennzeichnet durch, sowie 3 Märchen aus Captain O'Connors Sammlung.]
- 163 Tibetan tales derived from Indian sources. Translated from the Tibetan of the Kahgyur by F. Anton von Schiefner, and from the German into English by W. R. S. Ralston, M.A. With an introduction. New edition with a preface by C. A. F. Rhys Davids, D.Litt., M.A. London: George Routledge & Sons 1925.
- 164 Kalewala, das National-Epos der Finnen. Übertragung von Anton Schiefner. Bearbeitet und durch Anmerkungen und eine Einführung ergänzt von Martin Buber. 5. Tausend. Verbesserte Neuausgabe. Berlin: Lambert Schneider [1927]. XX, 355 S. OHLdr Vorwort zu dieser Ausgabe, [V] gez.: Heppenheim an der Bergstraße, Ende 1921. Martin Buber.
- 165 Ghoshal, U. N.; N. Dutt (Übers.): Täranäth's History of Buddhism in India. Translated from the German version of A. Schiefner. Indian Historical Quarterly 3.1927, 508-510, 803-807; 4.1928,530-533; 5.1929,715-721; 6.1930,334-344; 7.1931, 150-160; 8.1932,247-252; 10.1934,551-559.
- 166 Heldensagen der Minussinschen Tataren. Rhythmisch bearbeitet von Anton Schiefner. Friedrichsegen/Lahn: Folkwang-Auriga-Verlag 1929. LXII, 142 S. (Kulturen der Erde: Abteilung Textwerke.)
- 167 Kullerwo. Ein finnisches Heldenlied aus dem Kalewala. Ins Deutsche übertragen von Anton Schiefner. Bearbeitet und herausgegeben von Heinz Flügel. Berlin: Verlag Die Rabenpresse (1939). 71 S. (Die Kunst des Wortes. 12/13.) Satz und Druck der Offizin Haag Drugulin in Leipzig. 67-70: Nachwort, gez.: H. F. 71 : Erklärung der Namen Veränderte Neuausgabe.
- 168 Kalewala. Das Nationalepos der Finnen in der Übertragung von Anton Schiefner. Erster -Zweiter Band. Berlin: Lambert Schneider [1942]. XVIII, 396, 381 S. Gedruckt in der Offizin Poeschel & Trepte, Leipzig
- 169 Gold Khan [and other Siberian legends]. Translated by Norman Cohn. Preface by Arthur Waley [S. 7-8]. (London:) Secker & Warburg 1946. 180 S.
- 170 Kalevala. Das Nationalepos der Finnen. Nach der zweiten Ausgabe ins Deutsche übertragen von Anton Schiefner 1852, in neuer Übersetzung durch Dagmar Welding. Stuttgart: Philipp Otto Röhm Verlag 1948. 689 S.
- 171 Kalevala. Das Nationalepos der Finnen. Nach der zweiten Ausgabe ins Deutsche übertragen von Anton Schiefner 1852. In neuer Übersetzung durch Dagmar Welding. Stuttgart: Philipp Otto Röhm Verlag (1964). 692 S.
- 172 M. A. Castren: Grammatik der samojedischen Sprachen. With a foreword by Peter Hajdü. Bloomington, The Hague 1966. 8, XXIV, 608 S. (Indiana University Publications. Uralic and Altaic Series.53) Herausgegeben von Anton Schiefner. Reprinted [from the edition published as part of Castren's Nordische Reisen und Forschungen, 1854.]
- 173 Kalevala. (Das Nationalepos der Finnen.) Nach der deutschen Übertragung von Anton Schiefner und Martin Buber. Neubearbeitet und mit einem Nachwort versehen von Wolfgang Steinitz. Illustrationen Bert Heller. Rostock: VEB Hinstorff 1968. 408 S. 4° Auf 12438 Runen gekürzt.
- 174 Tibetan tales derived from Indian sources. Translated from the Tibetan of the Kahgyur by F. Anton von Schiefner, and from the German into English by W. R. S. Ralston, M.A. With an introduction. New edition with a preface by C. A. F. Rhys Davids, D.Litt., M.A. Norwood, PA: Norwood Editions 1975. LXV, 368 S. Reprint of the 1882 ed. published by J. R. Osgood, Boston.
- 175 Tibetan tales derived from Indian sources. Translated from the Tibetan of the Kahgyur by F. Anton von Schiefner, and from the German into English by W. R. S. Ralston, M.A. With an introduction. New edition with a preface by C. A. F. Rhys Davids, D.Litt., M.A. Folcroft, PA: Folcroft Library Editions 1976. LXV, 368 S. Reprint of the 1882 ed. published by J. R. Osgood, Boston.
- 176 Kalevala. Das Nationalepos der Finnen. (Aus dem Finnischen nach der deutschen Übertragung von Anton Schiefner und Martin Buber. Neubearbeitet von Wolfgang Steinitz. Mit einem Nachwort von Richard Semrau.) Leipzig: Reclam 1984. 386 S. (Reclams Universal-Bibliothek. 1030.)
- 177 Sampo und Kullervo. Aus dem Kalevala. Illustriert von Osmo Niemi. (Rostock:) Hinstorff Verlag 1985. 156 S.
- 178 Kalevala. 41. Gesang. Mit 4 Farbholzschnitten von Archibald Bajorat. Koblenz: Edition Plato 1985. 10 Bl. auf Bütten. 4° (Kalevala-Presse. 1.)
- 179 Kalevala. 45. Gesang. Koblenz: Edition Plato 1987. 24 ungez. Bl. 4° Mit 4 ganzseitigen Farbholzschnitten von Archibald Bajorat. (Kalevala-Presse.2.)
- 180 Buddhistische Triglotte. A Sanskrit-Tibetan-Mongolian glossary. A Xylographie print from Mongolia preserved in the Baron Schilling von Canstadt collection. Reproduced with a German foreword by Franz Anton Schiefner in 1859. [Reprint.] New Delhi: Ngawang Topgay 1987. 79 S.
- 181 Tibetan tales, derived from Indian sources. Translated from the Tibetan of the Kah Gyur by F. Anton von Schiefner and from the German into English by W. R. S. Ralston. With an introduction. New edition with a preface by C. A. F. Rhys Davids. Delhi: Sri Satguru Publ. (1988). LXV, 368 S. (Bibliotheca Indo-Buddhica.52.)
- 182 Tibetan tales derived from Indian sources. Translated from the Tibetan of the Kahgyur by F. Anton von Schiefner, and from the German into English by W. R. S. Ralston, M.A. With an introduction. New edition with a preface by C. A. F. Rhys Davids, D.Litt., M.A. Taipei: SMC (1990). XLV,368 S.
- 183 Kalewala. Das Nationalepos der Finnen. Nach der zweiten Ausgabe ins Deutsche übertragen von Anton Schiefner. München: Säur (1990–1994). (Bibliothek der deutschen Literatur: Mikrofiche-Gesamtausgabe nach den Angaben des Taschengoedeke. Eine Edition der Kulturstiftung der Länder. 16888.)
- 184 The Bible of Tibet: Tibetan tales from Indian sources. Translated from the Tibetan of the Kahgyur by F. Anton von Schiefner and from the German into English by W. R. S. Ralston. New edition, with a preface by C. A. F. Rhys Davids. London, New York, Bahrain: Kegan Paul (2003). XLV, 368 S. (The Kegan Paul Library of Religion and Mysticism.)
