= Moritzburg (Halle) =

Fortified castle in Germany

Coordinates: 51°29′10″N 11°57′48″E

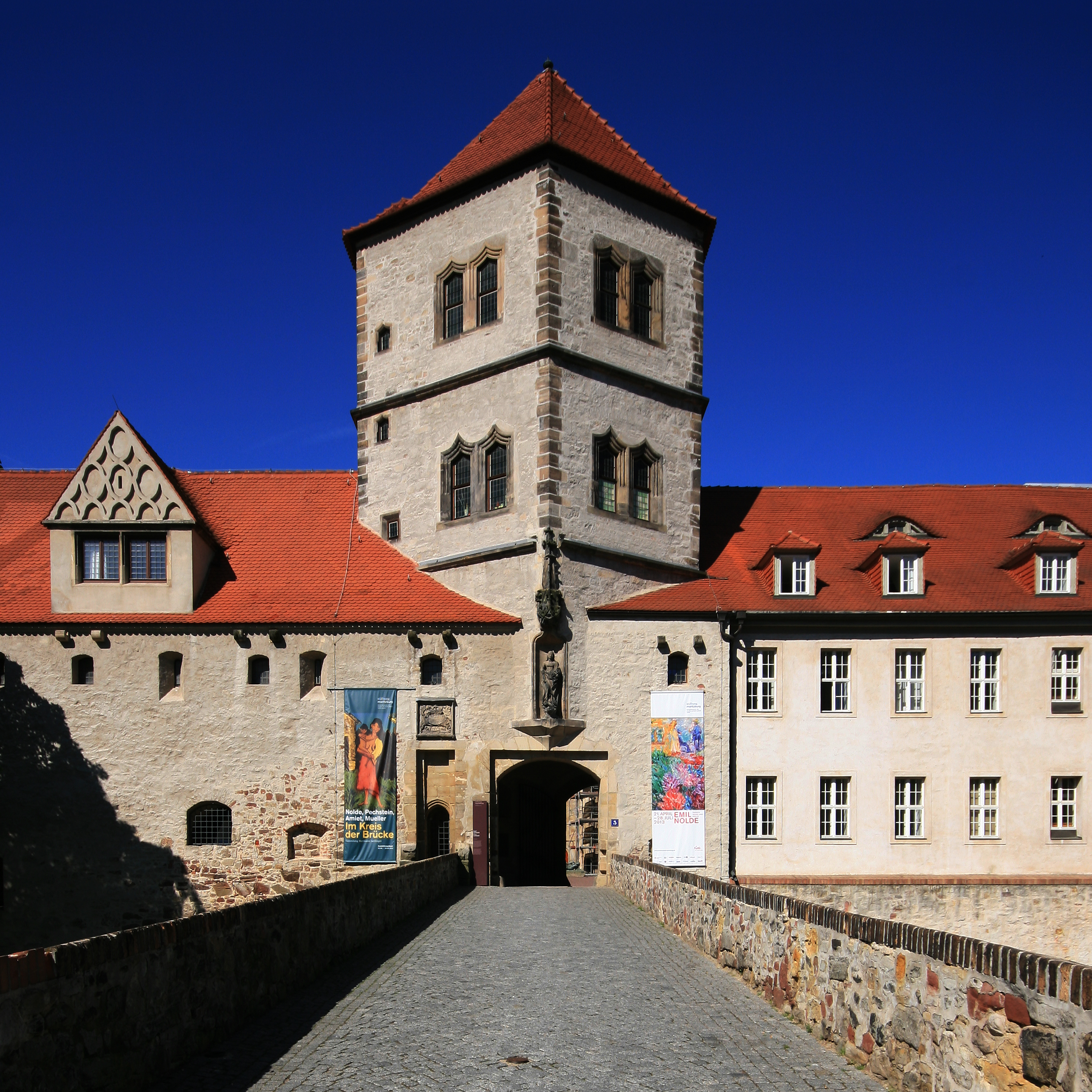
Moritzburg, main gate

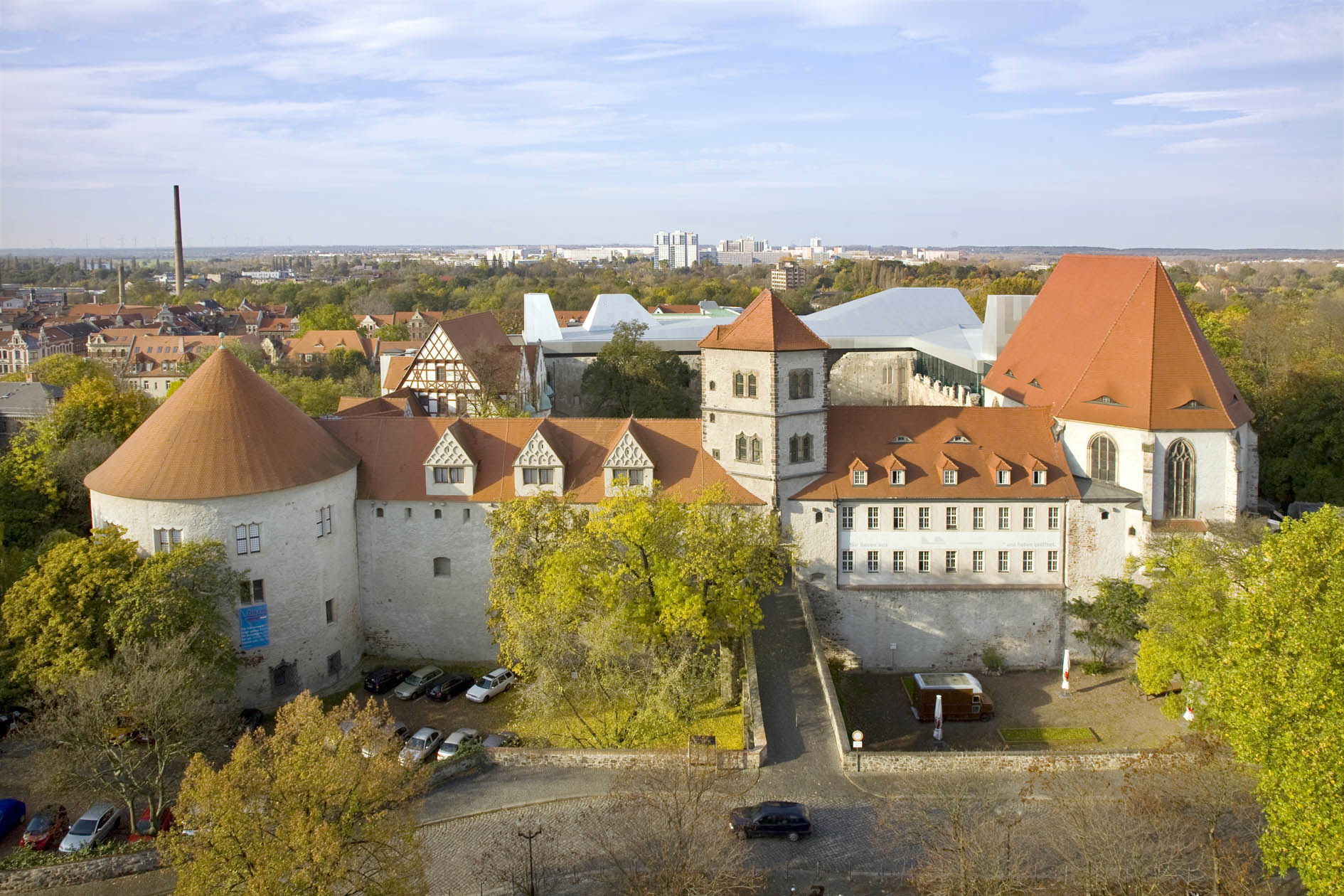
Moritzburg

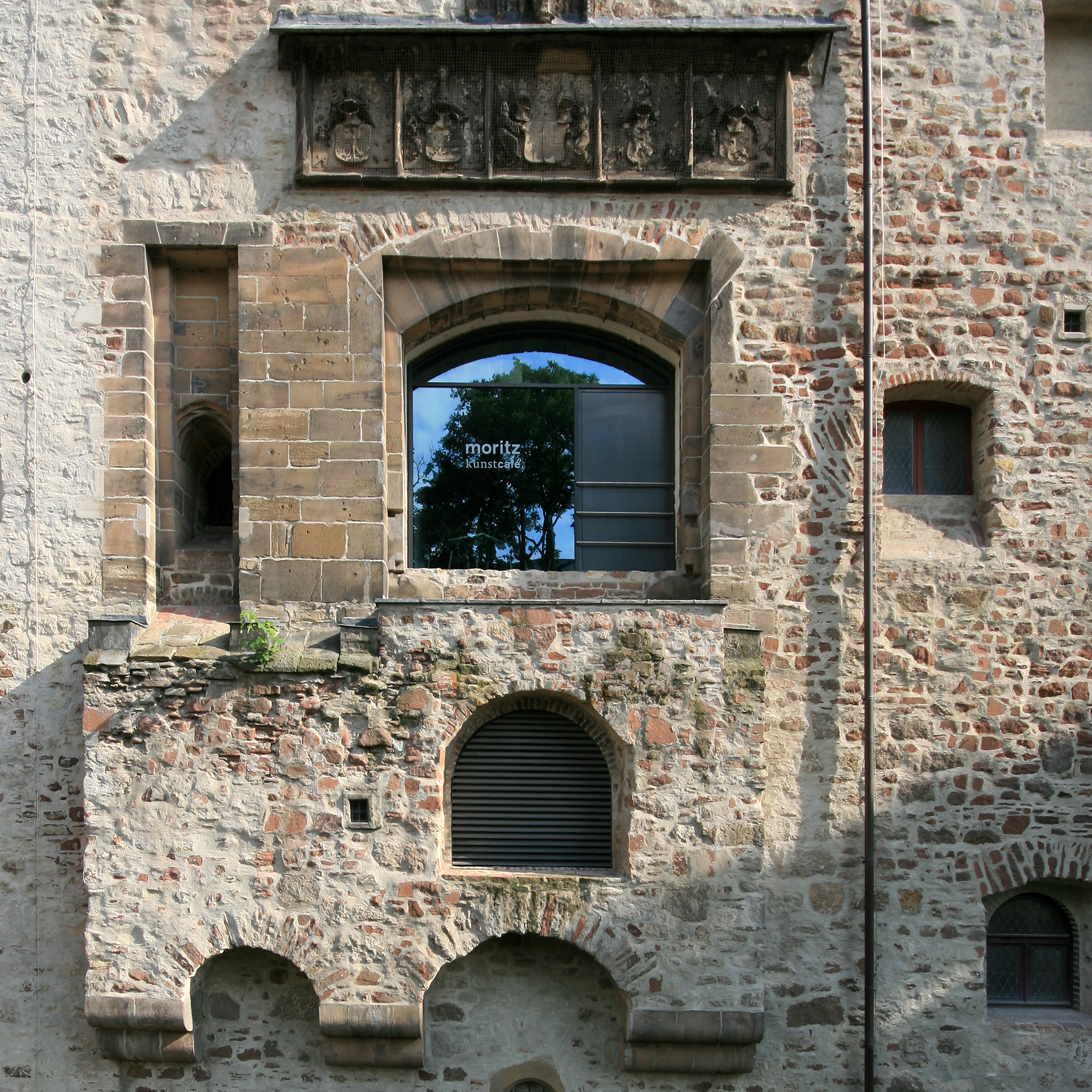
Moritzburg, old gate at the north wall

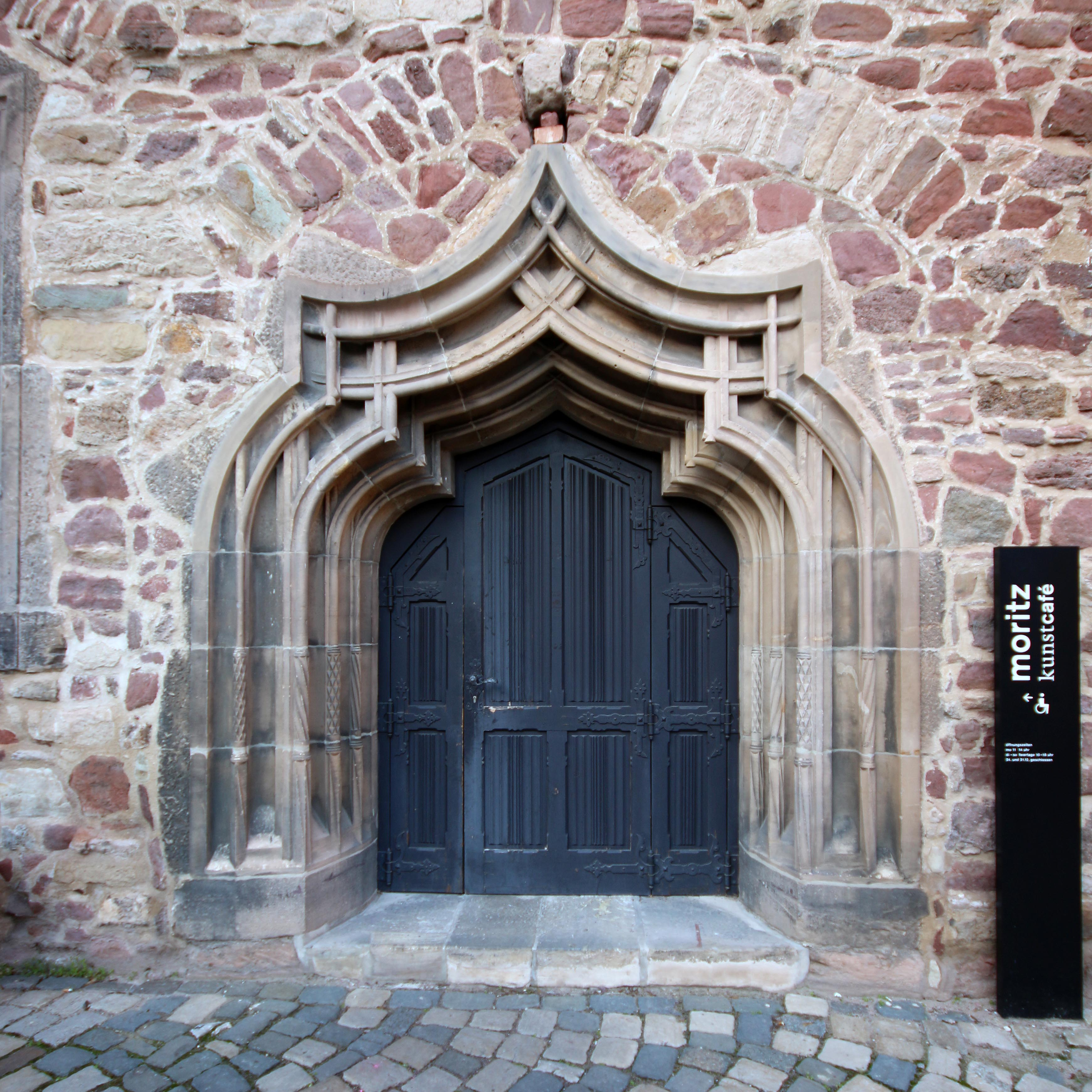
Moritzburg, door of the north wing

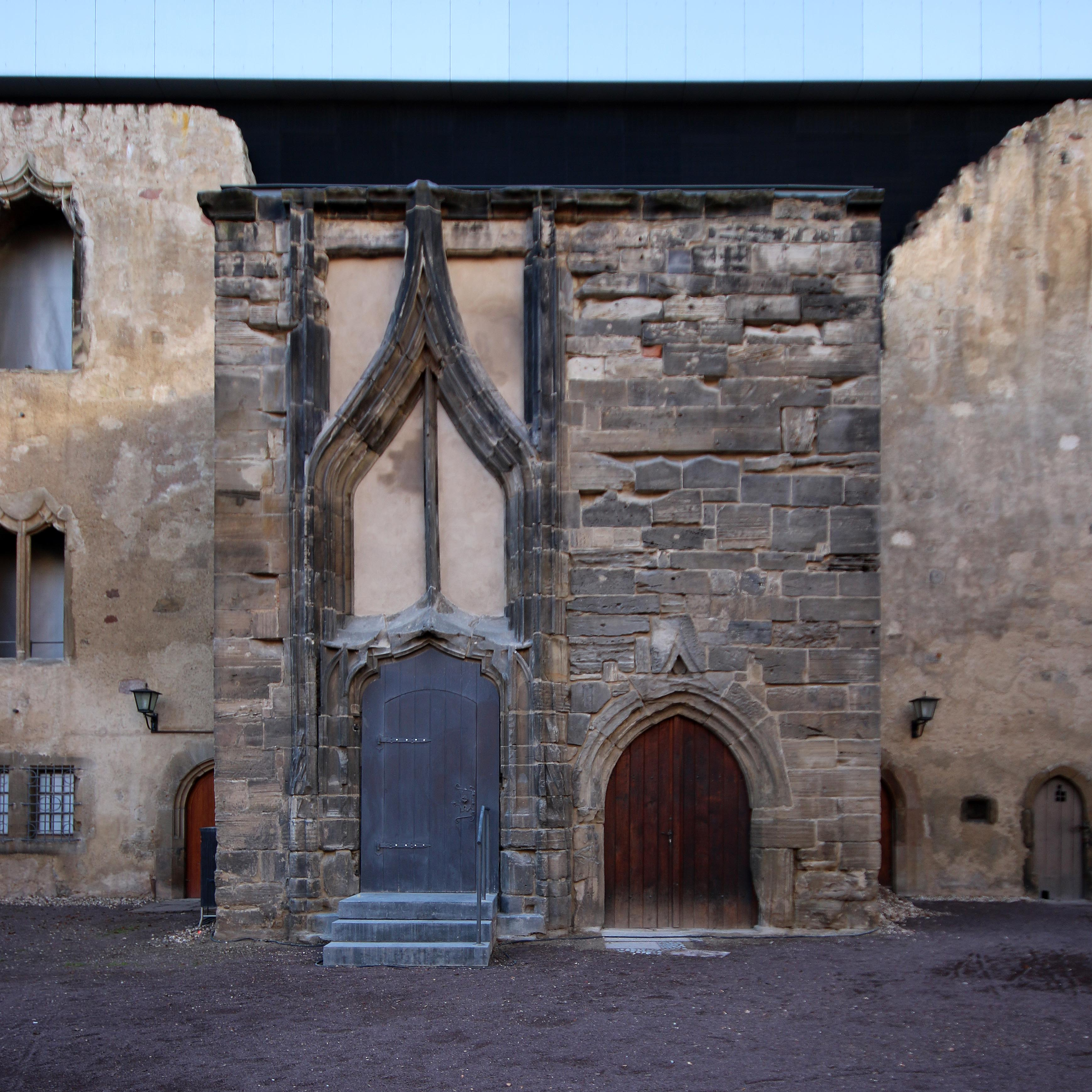
Moritzburg, west wing

The Moritzburg (German pronunciation: [ˈmoːʁɪtsˌbʊʁk]) is a fortified castle in Halle (Saale), Germany. The cornerstone of what would later become the residence of the Archbishops of Magdeburg was laid in 1484; the castle was built in the style of the Early Renaissance.

Since the end of the 19th century, it has housed an arts museum which is recognised as being of national importance.

== History ==
=== Origins ===
The history of the Moritzburg is closely connected to that of Halle. In 968, when the Archbishopric of Magdeburg was established by Otto I, Holy Roman Emperor, he granted the archbishop his Giebichenstein Castle near Halle. Already in the 13th century, powerful aristocrats could buy privileges, reduce the influence of the sovereign, the Archbishop of Magdeburg, on the town. Thus, Halle had practically reached a state of political autonomy in 1263. The same happened with Magdeburg and when the archbishops finally left Magdeburg, after a series of conflicts with the ever more powerful city council, Giebichenstein Castle became their principal residence in 1382.

In the 15th century a group of the important guilds formed an opposition and demanded representation in the city council, which was until then dominated by the urban aristocrats. In 1479, the opposition conspired with the sovereign and opened the gates of the city for the Archbishop's troops. After sparse resistance, Archbishop Ernest II. of Saxony, who was only 14 years of age at the time, moved into the town. As a consequence, the town lost its earlier gained freedoms and it was determined ein festes Schloss zu erbauen, um die Stadt besser in Gehorsam, Unterwürfigkeit und Ruhe zu erhalten: to build a castle in order to gain better control over the town and keep it obedient and quiet.

=== Construction history ===
Construction began promptly with first surveying in April 1479. The search for an adequate location, however, proved difficult due to poor soil conditions. A location was finally found, incorporating the city wall, on the site of the former Jewish settlement northwest of the city.

Archbishop Ernest personally laid the cornerstone of his new residence on May 25, 1484 in a ceremonial procession and named the castle Moritzburg after Saint Maurice, the Patron Saint of the country.

The Moritzburg still exhibits signs of the late Gothic period; but the almost regular layout, the consistent floor levels and the representative impression of the horizontally emphasized facades show that the castle already belongs to the Renaissance period. The Moritzburg combines the concepts of a fortress with that of a castle, unifying the residence and the defence aspects of the complex.

In the beginning, the construction was supervised by Peter Hanschke of East Prussia. Starting from 1533, Andreas Günther, general master builder of the dioceses of Mainz and Magdeburg then created the fortress walls and probably also the round bastions on the east side. The design of the Magdalenenkapelle (Mary-Magdalene Chapel) is attributed to Ulrich von Smedeberg.

On May 25, 1503, Archbishop Ernest could move into the imposing castle. His arx insuperabilis (invincible fortress) was financed mainly from the salines of Halle's aristocrats, which had been confiscated in 1479. Total construction cost was announced to be 150,000 Guilders.

=== Early years until the Reformation ===
The reign of the builder, Archbishop Ernest II. of Saxony, was distinguished on the one hand by his victory over Halle in 1479 and, on the other hand, by manifold promotions of his new residence city.

His successor Albrecht of Brandenburg, elected in 1513, became sovereign of Halle. Prior to this, he had been Erzkanzler des Reiches (Archchancellor of the state), cardinal, Archbishop and Prince-elector of Mainz, Archbishop of Magdeburg and Administrator of Halberstadt.

In 1517, he called the Dominican friar Johann Tetzel to the Moritzburg and started a limitless sale of indulgences, financing the archbishop's large collection of relics. The collection, which was first housed in the castle's chapel and later moved to the city's cathedral, composed of 353 reliquaries with as much as 21,484 single relics, among these 42 whole bodies of saints, rendering it ideally and materially extremely valuable; it was the most outstanding of its kind in Germany. After the Protestant Reformation Albrecht gave up the city and retreated to Mainz.

During the Schmalkaldic War, the Moritzburg was occupied by imperial troops. On June 10, 1547 Holy Roman Emperor Charles V moved into Halle upon his victory in the Battle of Mühlberg; his military leader, the Duke of Alba, occupied the Moritzburg.

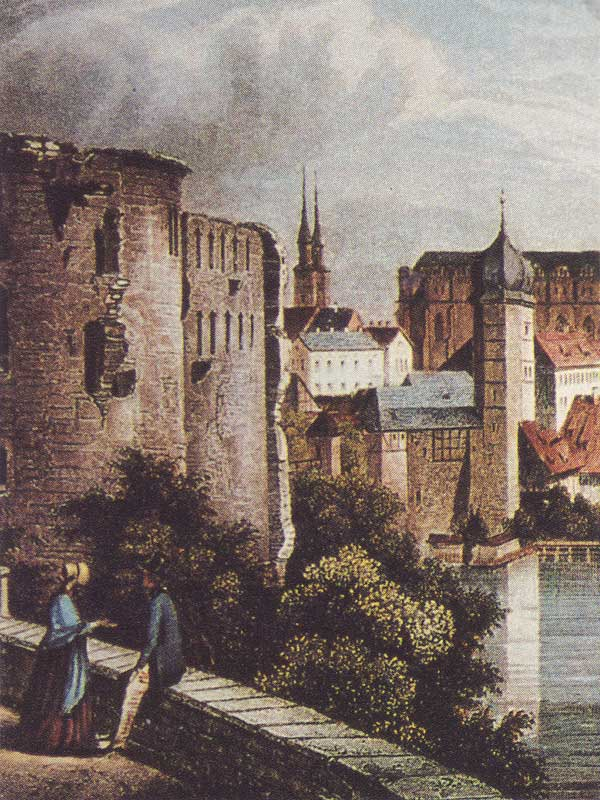
Moritzburg and Halle (Saale) as seen from the Jägerberg hill, around 1855

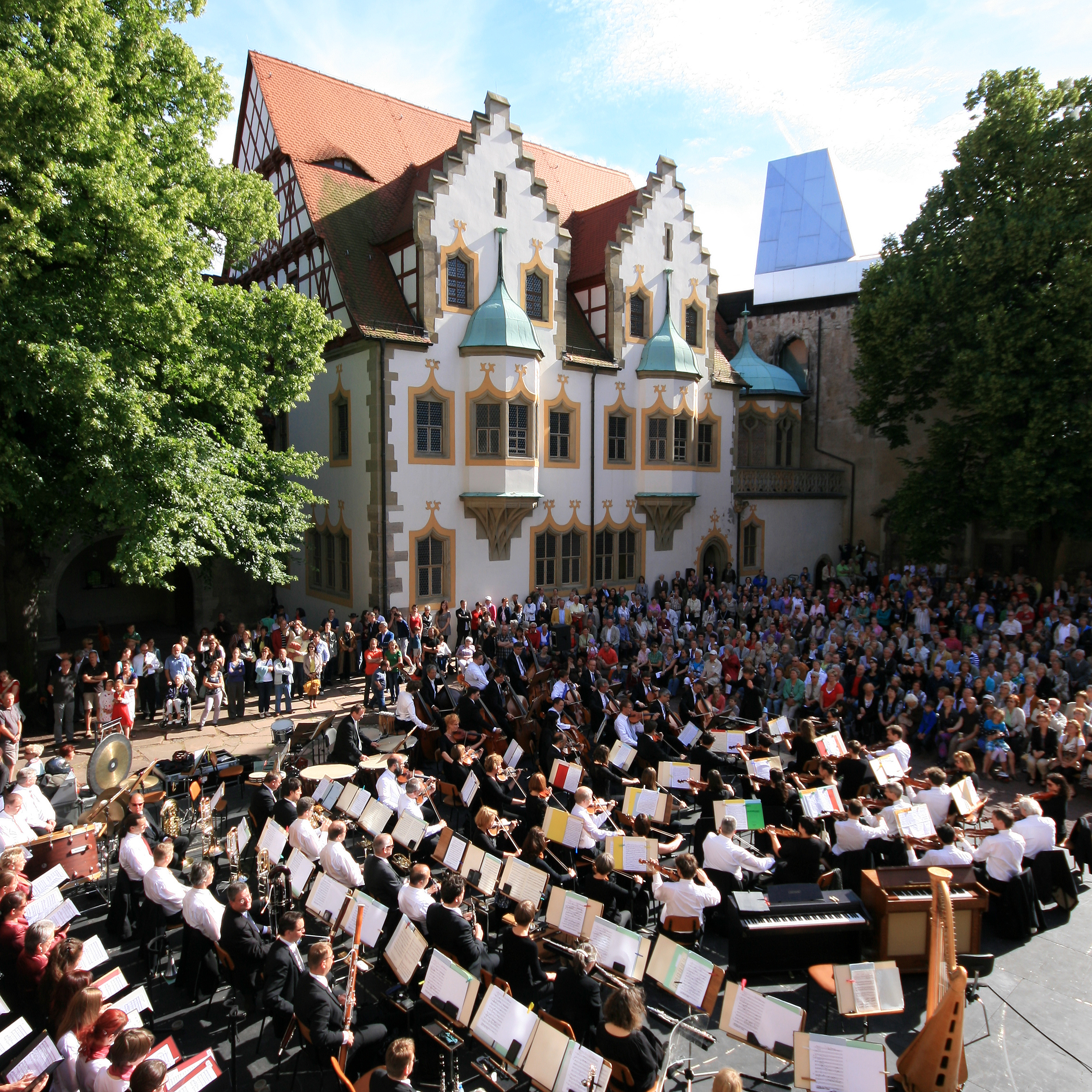
Talamt, concert at the Moritzburg

=== Thirty Years' War ===
In the Thirty Years' War both the city of Halle and the Moritzburg time and again attracted troops. In October 1625 Wallenstein occupied town and fortress. After the defeat at Breitenfeld, the Count of Tilly moved, pursued by the Swedes, to the Moritzburg as a first retreat. In September 1631 the Swedish king Gustavus Adolphus appeared before Halle and could peacefully occupy it for a longer period. Following the Peace of Prague in 1635 the Emperor acknowledged the Duke of Saxony-Weißenfels as the new Administrator.

On January 6, 1637, under siege by the Swedes, a fire broke out in the castle. All the upper floors of the west and north side as well as the chapel were destroyed, forcing the inhabitants to surrender. On March 19, 1639 Saxon troops blasted the south-western bastion, in turn forcing the - now Swedish - inhabitants to give up, which happened three days later. August, son of the Saxon Prince-elector John George was subsequently appointed the new Administrator. He insisted on vacating the castle of troops to reduce its strategic attraction. A neutrality contract between August and the Swedes kept Halle free from the Thirty Years' War from then on. The Moritzburg was not rebuilt, only the chapel was partly reconstructed as to be used for worship again.

=== Under Brandenburg-Prussia ===
With the death of August in 1680, the city of Halle was transferred to Brandenburg, as designated by the peace treaty of Westphalia. In 1686 the Huguenots of Halle were allowed to use the Gate Tower of the Moritzburg for their religious service. On October 26, 1690 they moved into the Magdalene Chapel.

In 1717 the Prussian Anhaltinisches Regiment of about 3,500 soldiers moved into the Moritzburg. In front of the compound a parade ground was established, where Prince Leopold I of Anhalt-Dessau, nicknamed der Alte Dessauer (the Old Dessauer), drilled the troops.

In the Seven Years' War (1756-1763) as well as in the late Napoleonic Wars (around 1813), the Moritzburg served as a military hospital. Later, the vaults of the castle were leased to a brewery, while the chapel, which had been used by the French community until 1808, became a storage room. The Prussian government bought the ruins back from the leaseholders in the years from 1847 to 1852, for the sum of 24,800 thalers.

There existed plans for a reconstruction of the complex for the University of Halle by Karl Friedrich Schinkel, but the project was cancelled due to lack of funding.

Since 1900, the structural condition of the castle deteriorated dramatically. In 1897 the East, South and West wings were sold to the city of Halle for a new museum. Funded by donations, the Talamt, the southern battlements, the Gate Tower and the South Bastion were reconstructed to house the museum.

=== World War II until present ===
In World War II the deep vaults of the complex served as an air-raid shelter for the Halle citizens and the Gauleitung (Gau administration) of the NSDAP. The cellar was also used to store valuable portals and pieces of the castle architecture.

The upper rooms of the West wing were restored between 1951 and 1954. The lower floor of the same housed a restaurant and a small theater since 1964-67. The North-east bastion became a Student Club in 1972. From the 1990s the castle underwent major reconstructions, which were completed in 2008. The architects of the reconstruction, in which the ruined western part of the castle received a modern roof and interior, were Fuensanta Nieto and Enrique Sobejano.

== Description ==
The layout is based on an almost regular quadrangle of about 72 by 85 meter side length. The castle was mainly built from quarrystone and was surrounded by a 20 to 25 meter wide and 10 meter deep, once swampy, moat on its southern, eastern and northern side. The western side was protected by a system of staggered walls towards the river Saale.

The courtyard was large enough for festivities, processions or tournaments and is heaped up to the level of the city streets

=== West wing ===
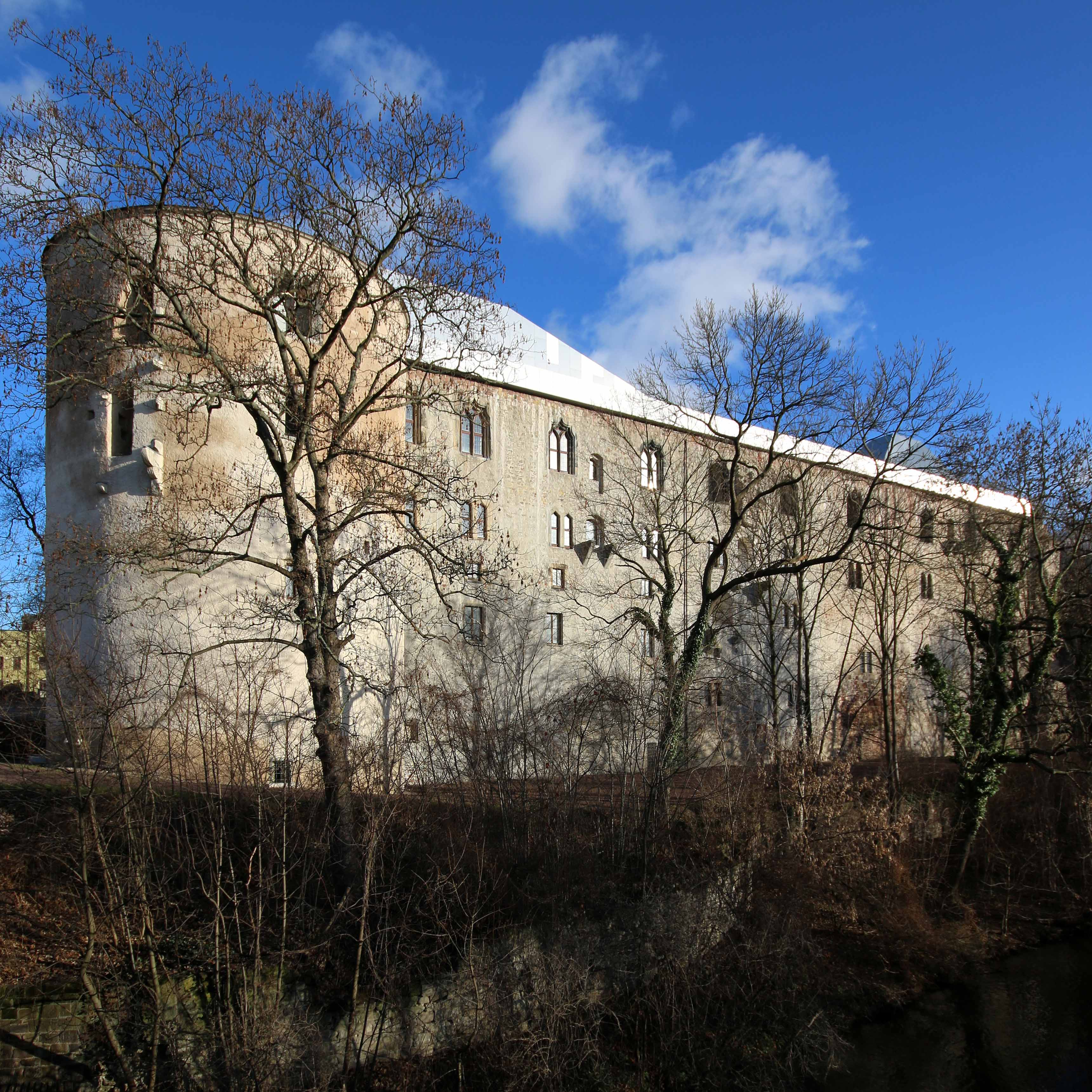
Moritzburg, west wing.

The West Wing is the main side, the outward side of the castle. The top floors consisted of splendorous halls, whereas the vaults of the upper basement floor, which are today occupied by the museum, most probably housed the rooms of the castle inhabitants. Above, today mostly in ruins, lay two floors of the archbishop's personal and official rooms. In the northern part of the West Wing were the chambers of the sovereign and the library. The staircase in the middle of the courtyard wall is quite noticeable for being one of the first stairways in Germany which is constructed into the building structure and not just applied on the outside.

=== North wing ===
The original main entrance, which can still be recognized by its coat-of-arms frieze, lay in the northern wall but was abandoned in 1616 and consequently blocked up. Above the basement lay two floors, serving as the chambers for officials and as an archive. On the event of the Halle's university's bicentennial in 1894, the north wing was equipped with gym and fencing halls, which were still used for PE lessons up to 1990. The castle's chapel was constructed from 1505 and was dedicated to Mary Magdalene in 1509.

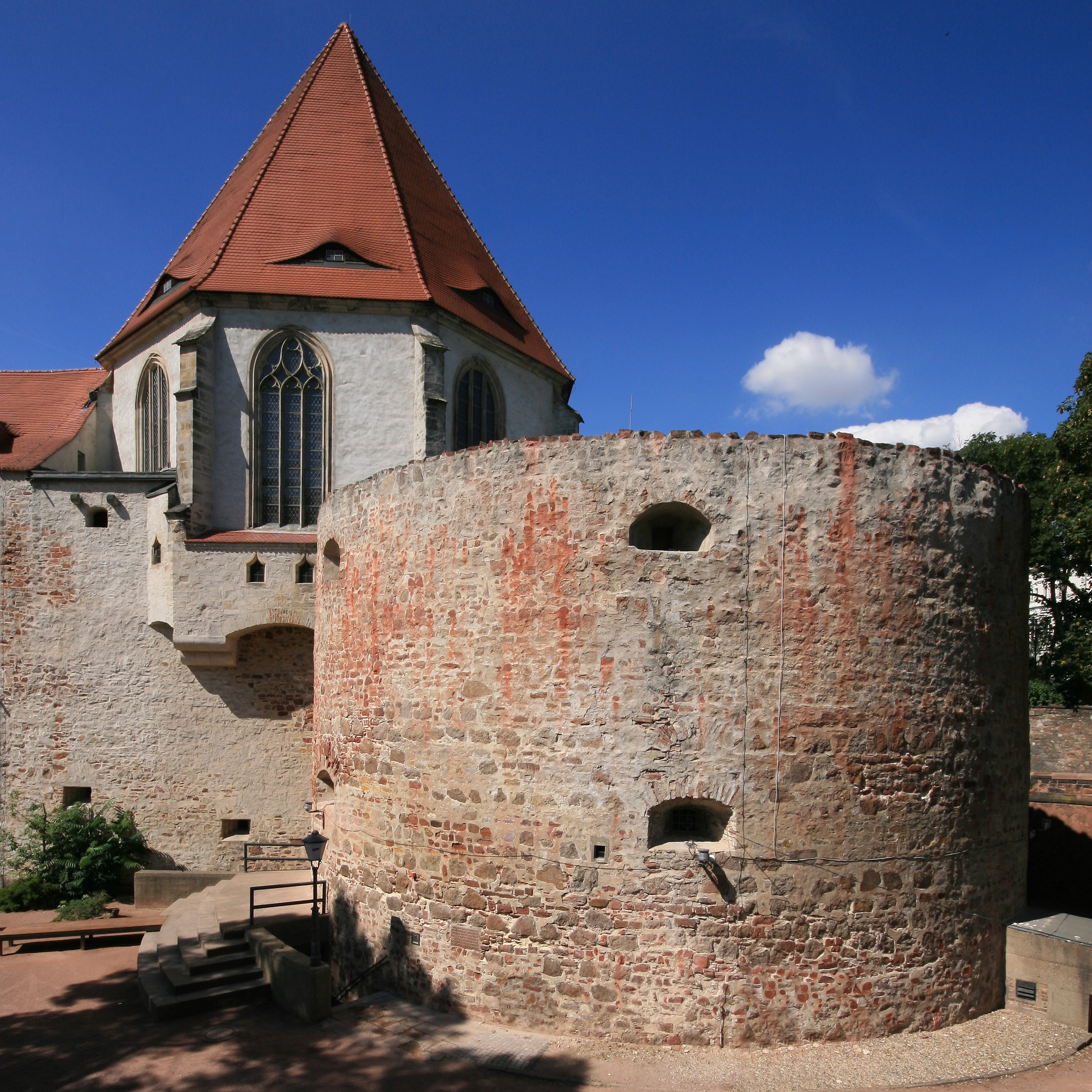
Moritzburg, north-east tower.

=== East wing ===
The entrance tower facing the town stands above the eastern wall and housed living rooms and, on the lowest floor, a chapel. To prevent direct shelling of the gates the gateway was constructed in a light curve. The east wing originally consisted of narrow two-floor battlements, the lower floor had open arcades and loop-holes. In 1777 the Baroque, so called Lazarettbau (military hospital) was erected above the eastern foundation walls for the Prussian garrison. The south-eastern bastion was expanded for the museum in 1913. The north-east tower has housed a student club since 1972.

=== South wing ===
The south side of the castle is no longer conserved in its original state. Here were the outbuildings, the chambers of the castle's captain and the vital wells. It is suspected that the stables were also in the south wing. Between 1582 and 1680 the archiepiscopal mint was situated the spacious vaults below courtyard level.

=== The Mary-Magdalene Chapel ===
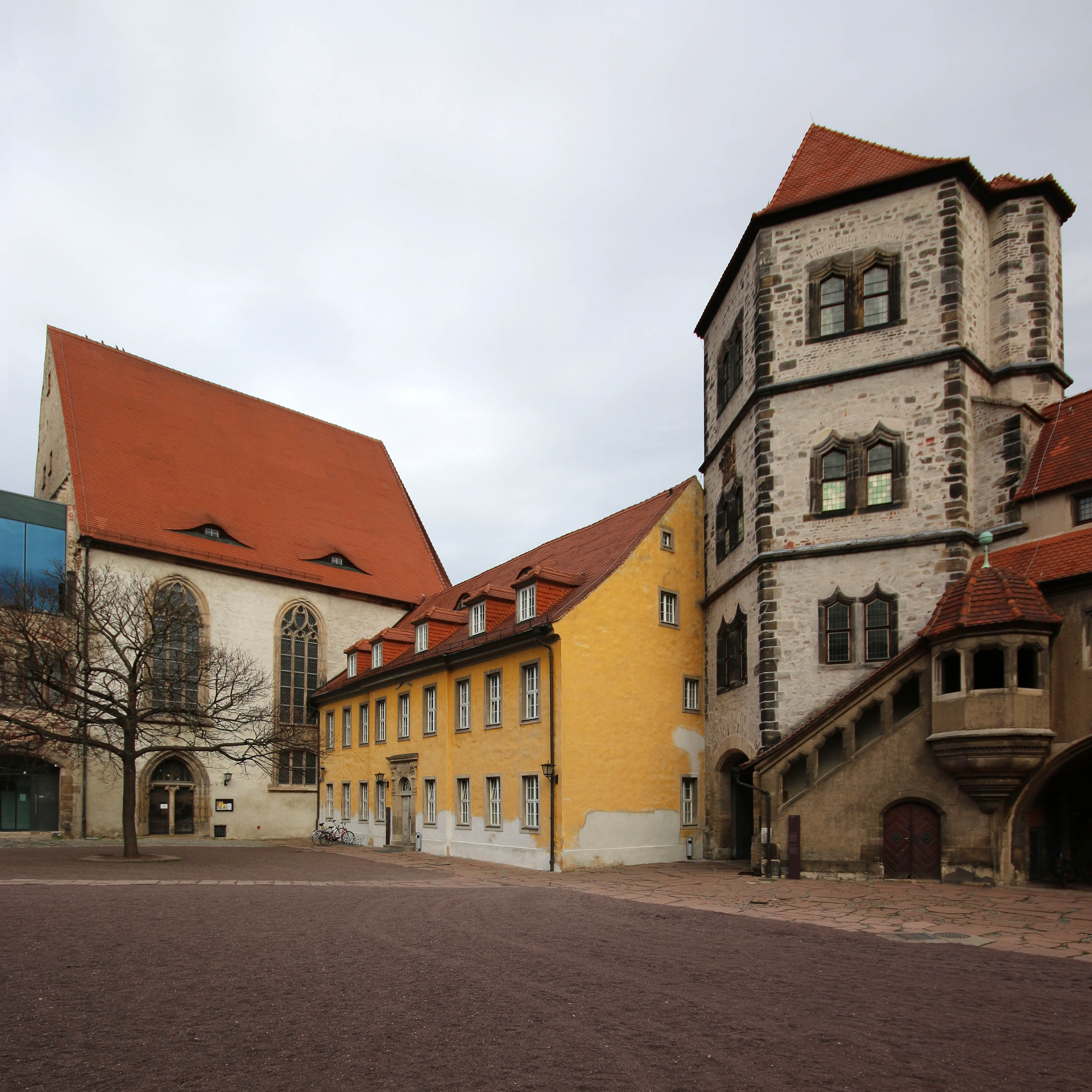
Moritzburg, inner ward with Mary-Magdalene Chapel.

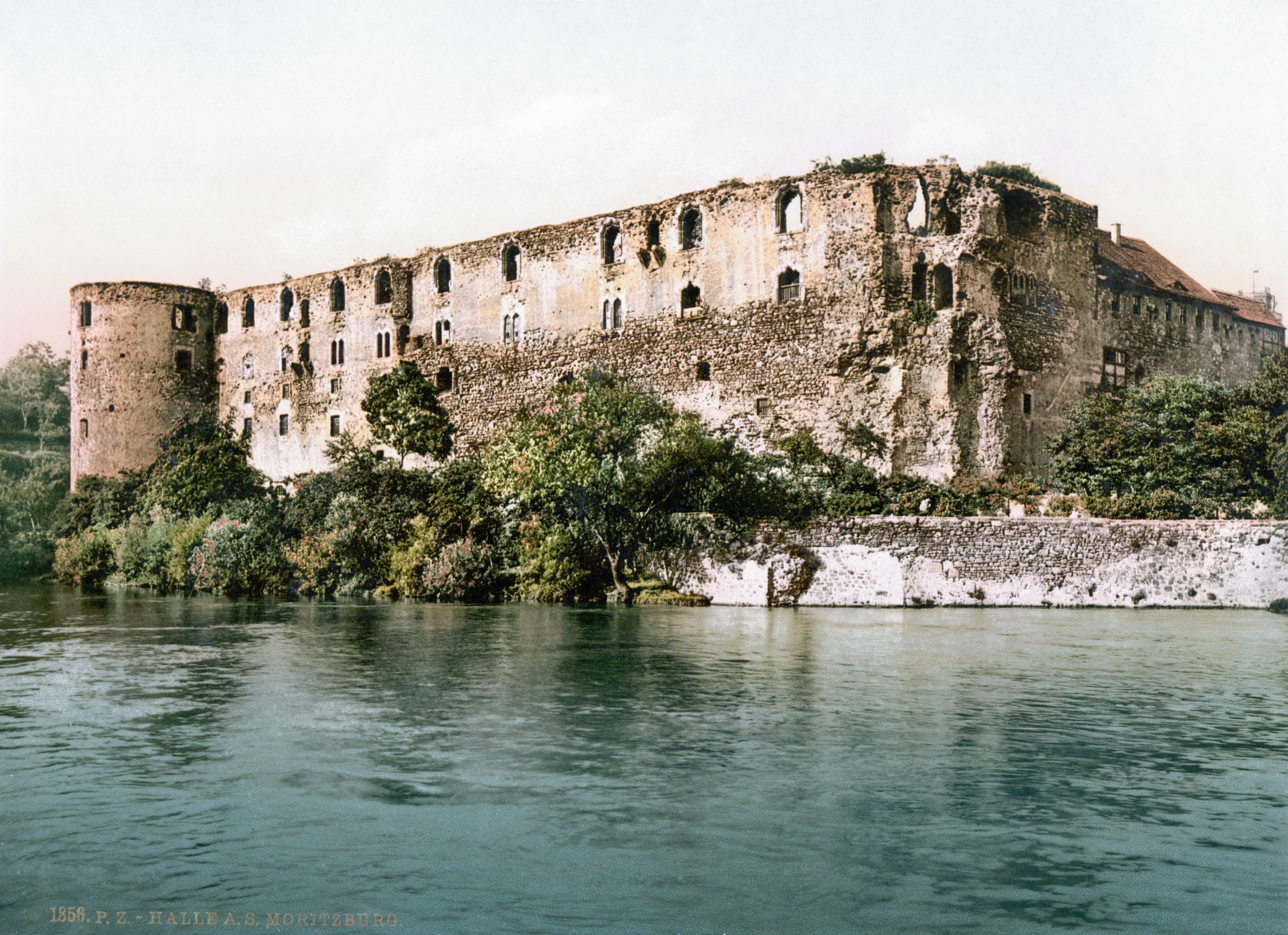
The Moritzburg around 1900

The Maria-Magdalenen-Kapelle (Mary-Magdalene Chapel) has only a small footprint of only 14 by 23 m and a height of 15 m, but seems much more spacious on the inside.

A memorial plate of the consecration in 1514 is found on the northern wall and shows the coat of arms of Cardinal Albrecht V of Brandenburg along with Saint Maurice and Mary Magdalene.

A separate coat of arms was designed especially for the chapel and placed on the western wall above the gallery. It dates the year of completion as 1509, although the papal confirmation was only received years later.

The chapel lost its roof during the Thirty Years' War which would -aside from quick repairs- not be reconstructed before about 200 years later between 1894 and 1899. In 1817 though, the Prussian Crown Prince Frederick William was so impressed by the Moritzburg that he became an official supporter of a reconstruction. On October 23, 1822 the complex including the chapel was designated a protected monument by the Prussian building authorities.

The first plans for the reconstruction were made in 1888. Between 1898 and 1899 the chapel was modified to become the university's church on occasion of the university's 200th anniversary. The organ, which was also from the time of the reconstruction, was thoroughly cleaned and altered in its tone structure in 1963. In 1990, a completely new organ was installed in the historical, heritage-protected casing.

Today the chapel is a place of worship and home to two religious communities: The United and Uniting University Church Community and the Lutheran Saint Magdalene Community of Halle/Salle.

=== Museum ===
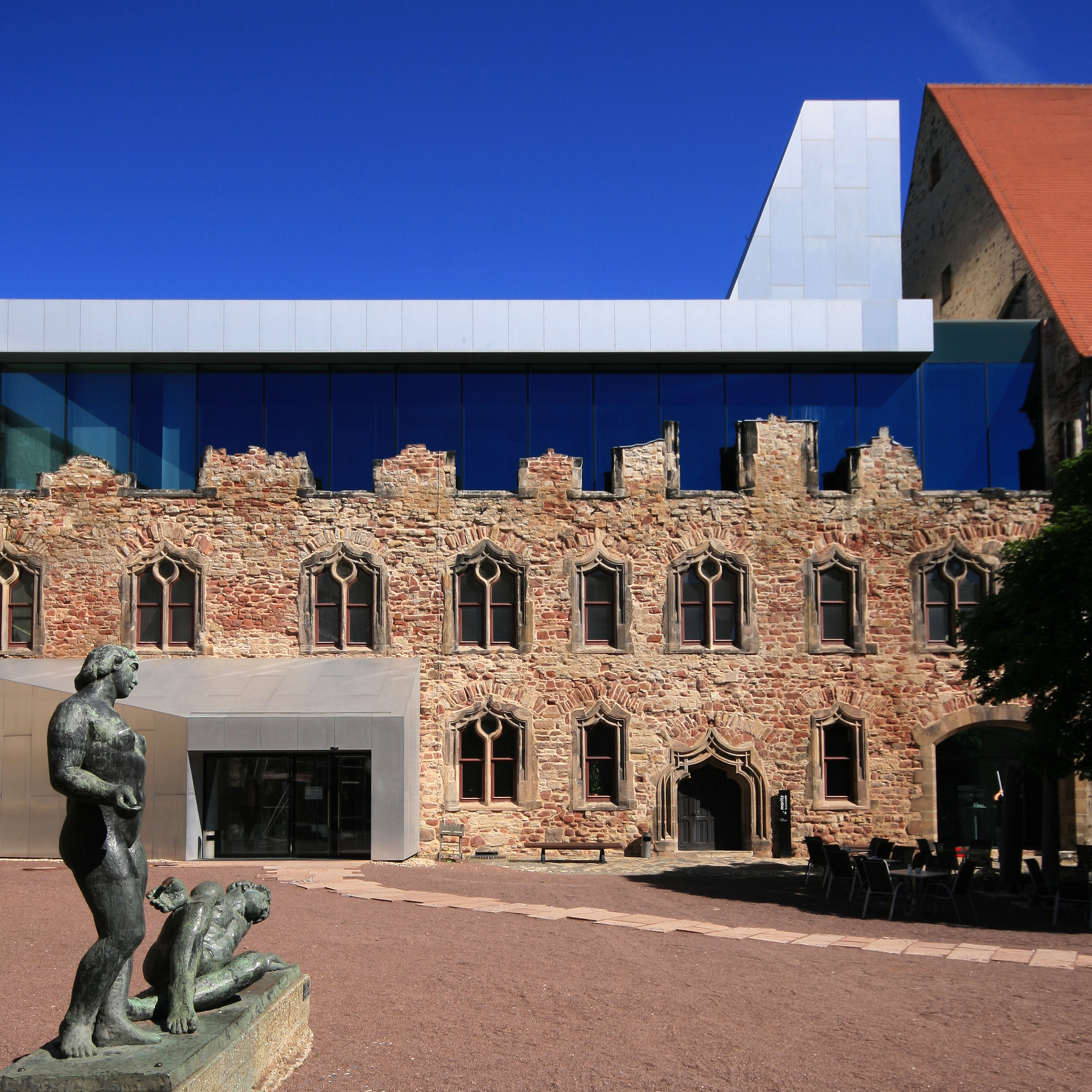
Moritzburg, entrance of the museum at the north wing

The Moritzburg houses the Kunstmuseum Moritzburg Halle (Saale). It has a collection of artworks mainly from the 20th and 21st century. The curator is Cornelia Wieg. The permanent collection includes:

- Classical modern art (Expressionism, Constructivism, New Objectivity), among them the painting The cathedral in Halle by Lyonel Feininger
- Art after 1945
- Art from the GDR
- Contemporary art
- Art from the 19th century
- Medieval art, including regional religious art
- Applied arts and design
- Coins and medals
- The Hermann Gerlinger collection of Die Brücke expressionist artworks
- Collection of prints and photographs

== General ==
The Moritzburg was the last of numerous castles built along the river Saale. Together with Burg Giebichenstein the city of Halle is therefore home to the oldest and the youngest of the Saale castles.
