= Isolde Schmitt-Menzel =

German artist, author, and photographer (1930–2022)

- Born: 11 April 1930; Eisenach, Thuringia, Germany
- Died: 4 September 2022 (aged 92); Frankfurt, Hesse, Germany
- Education: Burg Giebichenstein University of Art and Design
- Occupations: Artist; Author; Photographer

Isolde Schmitt-Menzel (11 April 1930 – 4 September 2022) was a German designer, author, illustrator, graphist, and ceramist.

== Biography ==
Schmitt-Menzel studied at the Burg Giebichenstein University of Art and Design in Halle. She wrote books for children as well as methods for practicing ceramics. She co-created the German television show Die Sendung mit der Maus.

Isolde Schmitt-Menzel died in Frankfurt on 4 September 2022 at the age of 92.

== Books ==
- Mosaik aus Stein, Glas, Holz, Papier (1968)
- Keramik bemalen (1970)
- Ton, geformt, bemalt, gebrannt (1970)
- Zwölf Wünsche für Elisabeth (1985)
- Maus und Bär beim Zahnarzt (1995)
- Maus, erzähl mir was von der Schule (1995)
- Die Maus sagt dir Gute Nacht (1997)
- Die Maus hat Geburtstag (1999)
- Die Maus auf dem Bauernhof (2001)
- Fingerspiele mit der Maus (2003)
