= Uwe Pfeifer =

Uwe Pfeifer (born 14 February 1947) is a German painter and graphic artist.

== Life and achievement ==
Born in Halle, Pfeifer learnt window dressing after his Abitur. From 1968 to 1973 he studied at the Hochschule für Grafik und Buchkunst Leipzig with Werner Tübke, Hans Mayer-Foreyt and Wolfgang Mattheuer. After his studies he returned to his hometown and got a teaching position for lithography at the art academy Burg Giebichenstein in 1975. In 1982 his work was presented in the DEFA documentary Stadtlandschaften.
