= Rolf Frick =

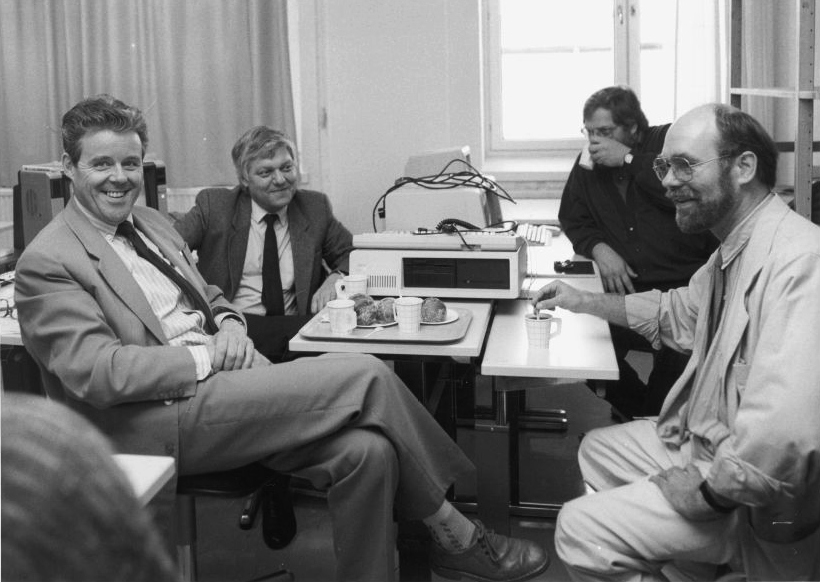
- Rolf Frick (to the left) during a visit to Finland.
- Born: 16 September 1936; Chemnitz, Saxony, Germany
- Died: 31 December 2008 (aged 72)
- Occupations: Professor; Politician
- Political party: LDP; FDP

Rolf Frick (born Chemnitz 16 September 1936: died 31 December 2008) was a German university professor and politician (LDP / FDP).

== Life ==
Rolf Frick was born in Chemnitz in the southern part of what was then central Germany. (Between 1953 and 1990 Chemnitz would be known as "Karl-Marx-Stadt", which is naturally reflected in contemporary sources.)

His father was the director of a publishing house and, a new government regime would later determine, a committed Nazi supporter. By the time he was 9, World War II had ended and Chemnitz found itself in the Soviet occupation zone of what remained of Germany. The leadership pursued a strategy which would lead to the creation, formally in 1949, of a stand-alone Soviet sponsored state, the German Democratic Republic. By 1949 a merger of political parties had already taken place, in April 1946, which formed the basis for a rapid return to centrally directed one-party government. Because of his father's Nazi past, Frick received no direct government authorization for his secondary education. Instead he undertook an apprenticeship as a type-setter while his later school-level education was based on correspondence courses and evening classes. He then moved on to the University of Technology at Karl-Marx-Stadt where he studied Mechanical Engineering, obtaining qualifications in Mechanical engineering and in Polygraphy, following which worked successively as a technical research assistant and in a series of teaching positions, still at Karl-Marx-Stadt.

He obtained a doctorate in 1978 with a dissertation entitled "Integration of Industrial Design within Product Development" ("Integration der industriellen Formgestaltung in den Erzeugnis-Entwicklungsprozess"). The topic fell within the field of Systematic Heuristics which during the 1950s and 60s took a more prominent place in the university syllabuses in the German Democratic Republic, and in which the Karl-Marx-Stadt University of Technology took a leading role. He moved north in 1979 when he obtained teaching chair as Professor for Design Methodology in Halle at the College of Arts and Design (in the "campus" then, as now impressively accommodated in Giebichenstein Castle).

In 1968, the year of his 32nd birthday, Frick joined the East German Liberal Democratic Party (LDP) which at that time had become one of the "bloc" parties controlled by the country's ruling Socialist Unity Party (SED) through an administrative structure known as the (East German) National Front. Following reunification in 1989/90 he would become more politically prominent, joining the FDP (Free Democrats) as a result of the east-west merger of German Liberal parties that occurred in 1990.

Between 1990 and 1994 he sat for the FDP as member of the Saxony-Anhalt regional assembly. Between 1990 and 1991 he served as chairman on the assembly's Culture and Media committee. Then, between 4 July 1991 and 21 July 1994 he was the regional Minister for Science and Research, first under Werner Münch and then under Christoph Bergner. The election for the Saxony-Anhalt regional assembly in 1994 saw support for the FDP party collapse from 13.5% in 1990 to 4.2%, which was below the 5% threshold needed to gain any seats, and Rolf Frick accordingly resigned his own seat on 21 July 1994. He now returned to work at The college. Later, in 1997, he became the Managing Director of Sandersleben Maschinen- u. Anlagenbau, a plant and machinery manufacturer located approximately 50 km (30 miles) north-west of Halle.

== Honour ==
- Honorary professorship from the Otto-von-Guericke University Magdeburg
