= Harold Reisch =

American politician (1920–2015)

Member of the U.S. House of Representatives from Missouri's 110th district

Missouri House of Representatives

Personal details
- Born: 1920 Springfield, Illinois, US
- Died: 2015 (aged 94–95)
- Party: Republican
- Spouse: Bessie L. Thatcher
- Children: 2 daughters
- Occupation: minister and businessman

Harold Franklin Reisch (August 5, 1920 – June 23, 2015) was an American Republican politician who served in the Missouri House of Representatives. He was born in Springfield, Illinois, and was educated at Illinois Wesleyan University and United Theological Seminary. On February 18, 1944, he married Bessie L. Thatcher in Argenta, Illinois. He served as a chaplain and captain with the combat engineers in Europe during World War II.
