= Eva Natus-Šalamounová =

Czech graphic artist and filmmaker (1936–2014)

- Born: 27 June 1936; Halle, Germany
- Died: 28 January 2014 (aged 77); Halle, Germany
- Known for: Graphic artist, educator

Eva Natus-Šalamounová (27 June 1936 – 28 January 2014) was a Czech graphic artist and filmmaker.

== Biography ==
Born in Halle, Natus-Šalamounová studied from 1954 until 1960 at the Burg Giebichenstein Kunsthochschule Halle under Walter Funkat. In the latter year she became an associate professor at the Academy of Arts, Architecture and Design in Prague, where she remained until 1963. She also worked at the Film and TV School of the Academy of Performing Arts in Prague. Active as a printmaker, she also produced illustrations for books and magazines and worked in the field of animation. She died in Halle. One of her prints is in the collection of the National Gallery of Art.

== Filmography ==
- Jolli (1964–1965) 35mm, colour, animated
- Der Igel Tappelpit (1965–1966) 35mm, colour, animated
- Dinge gibts - die gibts Nicht! (1964) 35mm, colour, animated
