= Andrea Tinnes =

German type designer, graphic designer and university teacher

Andrea Tinnes (*born 1969 in Püttlingen/Saar) is a German type designer, graphic designer and university teacher.

“Andrea Tinnes belongs to that rare breed, creating coherent, functional, innovative type families, and using them within a design practice that includes identity design, decoration, personal work, and teaching, with typefaces that range from the bizarre Haircrimes to the relatively sensible Skopex.” – Jan Middendorp

From 1989 to 1996 she studied Communications Design at the University of Applied Sciences, Mainz. The following years, 1996 to 1998, she studied Graphic Design at the California Institute of the Arts. From 1998 to 1999 she was design assistant at Jeffery Keedy in Los Angeles. Subsequently, from 1999 to 2000, she was lecturer for typography at the University of Applied Sciences Mainz. Since 2000 she has worked as an independent type designer and graphic designer in Berlin. In the years 2003 to 2005 she was guest lecturer at the Kunsthøgskolen i Bergen / Norway, later from 2005 to 2008 she became Adjunct Professor. In 2004 she founded her own fontlabel "typecuts". In 2007, she was a guest professor at the Burg Giebichenstein Kunsthochschule Halle. From 2007 to 2008, she became a visiting professor. In 2008, she was appointed professor for Schrift und Typografie.

In 2009 Tinnes was one of the five parties invited to compete in the design contest for Kieler Woche, to submit a poster design for the annual sailing event in Kiel.

From 2010 to 2014, she has been vice-rector for communication at the Burg Giebichenstein Kunsthochschule Halle.

In 2010, she was appointed a member of the Art Council of the Federal Ministry of Finance.

== Typefaces ==
- Burg Grotesk [2011/2015 ]
- PTL Roletta Sans [2004—2010]
- PTL Roletta Slab [2004—2010]
- PTL Roletta Ornaments [2004—2010]
- Viceroy [2007]
- PTL Skopex Gothic [2000—2006]
- PTL Skopex Serif [2000—2006]
- Broadway Hollywood [2005]
- Eastern Columbia [2005]
- Trivium [2005]
- Switch [2002]
- WeddingSans [2002]
- DasDeck [2000—2001]
- Haircrimes [2000—2001]
- Volvox [1999—2001]
