= Werner Laux =

German painter

- Laux in 1955
- Born: 15 April 1902; Berlin, Germany
- Died: 14 May 1975 (aged 73)
- Occupations: painter university teacher arts administrator Weißensee arts academy rector
- Political party: KPD; SED

Werner Laux (15 April 1902 – 14 May 1975) was a German painter, university teacher and arts official. He was something of a party stalwart: between 1952 and 1956 he served as rector (head) of the Arts Academy at Berlin-Weissensee.

== Life ==
Werner Laux was born in Berlin. His father was a postal official. Between 1919 and 1922 he undertook an apprenticeship in skilled factory work, the sector in which he was initially employed. From 1923 till 1925 he studied at the Beuth Academy ("Beuth Hochschule für Technik Berlin") and then at the Royal School of Art in Berlin, training as a teacher of arts and graphic drawing. During 1925/26 he was taught by Erich Wolfsfeld at the Vereinigte Staatsschulen (united Arts schools for pure and applied arts). He then worked as a freelance artist between 1926 and 1931.

By the later 1920s, with the economic situation still precarious, there was a steady increase in political polarisation. Werner Laux joined the Communist Party in 1929. It was, however, the Nazi Party that took power in January 1933, losing no time in transforming Germany into a one-party dictatorship. Laux continued to work as a painter and graphic artist till 1939, also undertaking (now illegal) "political work". With the German-Soviet invasion of Poland war broke out in September 1939, and he was conscripted into the army. He was badly injured at Stalingrad in 1942, and underwent a lengthy stay in a military hospital, after which he served in a medical battalion.

War ended in May 1945 and the central third of Germany—including the eastern part of Berlin—became the Soviet occupation zone, relaunched in October 1949 as the Soviet sponsored German Democratic Republic (East Germany). In 1945 Werner Laux took work as an employee with the local party leadership team for Berlin-Reinickendorf. In April 1946, following a contentious political merger, a new party was launched, and Laux was one of hundreds of thousands of Communist Party members who immediately signed their party membership over to the new Socialist Unity Party ("Sozialistische Einheitspartei Deutschlands" / SED), which now became the ruling party in a new kind of German one-party dictatorship. Between 1946 and 1948 Werner Laux headed up the Käthe Kollwitz Arts Academy (Käthe-Kollwitz-Kunstschule) in Berlin-Reinickendorf. During 1948/49 he served as a senior arts administrator for the State Culture Ministry in Mecklenburg.

In 1949 he was a co-founder and then till 1952 director of the Applied Arts Academy at Heiligendamm (Wismar) on the north coast. From 1950 he was also a member of the National Arts Commission. In 1949/50 he served as chairman of the Mecklenburg region Union of visual Artists ("Verband Bildender Künstler der DDR" / VBKD) also serving for a time as a member of the national committee of the union, membership of which was in effect mandatory for anyone wishing to pursue a career in the visual arts in East Germany. Between 1952 and 1956 he served both as director and as rector at the Arts Academy in Berlin-Weissensee. He received a professorship in 1953. Between 1956 and 1959 he was in charge of the Main Visual Arts Departments at the East German Culture Ministry. Then, during 1959/60, he worked as the ministry's specialist in East German Arts and Culture for (north) Viet Nam.

Between 1960 and 1965 Werner Laux held a teaching chair as professor and Institute Director at the Academy for Industrial Design at Giebichenstein Castle. From 1965 till 1968 he was in charge of the National Design Institute ("Zentralinstitut für Gestaltung") and was Design Council Secretary at the (East) German Office for Materials and Goods Testing. In 1968 Laux became an academic researcher with the regional board of the "Sports and Technology Society" ("Gesellschaft für Sport und Technik" / GST). He served briefly as a member of its central committee and was also a member of its water sports commission.

== Award and celebration ==
- 1967 Patriotic Order of Merit in bronze.

Obituary reports for members of the East German party establishment were generally highly formulaic. Nevertheless, even by the standards of the time and place, the one published in respect of Werner Laux by the party newspaper, Neues Deutschland, was exceptionally fulsome:

- "In him the party has lost a battle-hardened, tried and tested comrade, who placed all his strength, his wisdom and his experiences at the service of the working class, and [who was] steeped in love for the Soviet Union ..."
- "Mit Ihm verliert die Partei einen kampferprobten, bewährten Genossen, der seine ganze Kraft, sein Wissen und seine Erfahrungen in den Dienst der Arbeiterklasse stellte und von tiefer Liebe zur Sowjetunion durchdrungen war ..."
