= Robert Klümpen =

German painter (born 1973)

- Born: 1973 (age 52–53); Issum, North Rhine-Westphalia, Germany
- Education: Academy of Arts, Düsseldorf
- Known for: Painting
- Awards: Fellowship Kunstakademie Düsseldorf (1999); Fellowship in Venice, Studienstiftung des Deutschen Volkes (2004); Villa Romana Fellow (2005)

Robert Klümpen (born 1973 in Issum, North Rhine-Westphalia) is a German painter.

In 2001, he graduated from Academy of Arts, Düsseldorf, where he studied with A. R. Penck and Dieter Krieg.

He lives and works in Düsseldorf.

== Awards ==
- 1999 Fellowship Kunstakademie Düsseldorf
- 2004 Fellowship in Venice (Studienstiftung des Deutschen Volkes)
- 2005 Villa Romana Fellow

== Exhibitions ==
=== 2009–10 ===
- Galerie Wolfgang Gmyrek, Düsseldorf, "Ich bring Frische"

=== 2009 ===
- Galerie Seippel, Köln, "Schauraum Dachs u. Fuchs"

=== 2008 ===
- Galerie Peter Tedden, Düsseldorf, "Hier zu? Dann geh‘ an‘ Kiosk!"

=== 2007 ===
- Galerie Seippel, Köln
- Galerie Martina Detterer, Frankfurt/M., Bright Malkasten, Düsseldorf, Dicke Freunde (with Peter Josef Abels)

=== 2006 ===
- Villa de Bank, Enschede, Niederlande, lekker
- Galerie Seippel, Köln, Himmel un Ähd (Katalog)
- Galerie Peter Tedden, Düsseldorf, Klümpen und Lander. "Und gut is". (with Alexander Lauer)

=== 2005 ===
- "Einkehr", Emsdetterner Kunstverein
- "Zur Kasse, bitte", Ludwig Forum für Internationale Kunst, Aachen
- "gute Nacht", Kunstverein Göppingen

=== 2004 ===
- "Villa Romana-Preisträger", Von der Heydt Museum Wuppertal
- "Reserviert", Galerie Triebold, Riehen/Switzerland
- "Souvenir", Galerie Martina Detterer, Frankfurt am Main
- "Diensteingang", Centro Tedesco di Studi Veneziani, Venedig

=== 2003 ===
- "Helles und Dunkles", with Ulrich Meister, Galerie der Deutschen Gesellschaft für christliche Kunst e.V., Munich
- "Herbst", Galerie Peter Tedden, Düsseldorf
- "Lenz", Galleria Mudimadue, Milano

=== 2002 ===
- FFFZ Kunstforum, Düsseldorf
- Galerie Timm Gierig, Frankfurt
- Galerie Alfred Knecht, Karlsruhe
- "Gloria", Kunstraum Fuhrwerkswaage, Cologne
- "Tor", Kunstsommer Oberhausen 2002, Galerie Peter Tedden, Düsseldorf/Oberhausen
- "Vielen Dank, auf Wiedersehen", Galerie Lethert, Bad Münstereifel
- "Separée", Galerie Seippel, Cologne
- "Liveshow", La Lune en Parachute (Kunstverein), Epinal/France
- Galerie Jürgen Kalthoff, Essen
- "Pascha", Kunstverein Grafschaft Bentheim, Neuenhaus

=== 2001 ===
- "BILK", Galerie Triebold, Rheinfelden/Switzerland
- "Acryl auf Nessel", art-agents-gallery, Hamburg
- "Paper Jam – Junge Kunst im Fodus", Bielefelder Kunstverein
- "Malerei & Anstrich", mit Arno Bojak, Galerie Tedden, Düsseldorf
- "ACCROCHAGE", Galerie Schneiderei, Cologne
- Art Cologne, Galerie Triebold, Rheinfelden/Switzerland

=== 2000 ===
- "Von Chaos und Ordnung der Seele II", Mainz, Nürnberg
- "Garage", Kunstverein Oberhausen
- Galerie Schneiderei, Cologne
- "Zwinger", BBK Düsseldorf

=== 1999 ===
- Kunstverein Xanten e.V., with Sven Kroner
- "Höhe x Breite", Bayerische Landesbank, Luxembourg
- Museum Karlsruhe, with Frank Jebe
- Schauspielhaus Düsseldorf
- "Madau", Galerie Peter Tedden, Düsseldorf

=== 1998 ===
- "Düsseldorfer Akzente", Nordstern Versicherungs-AG, Cologne
