= Bert Heller =

German painter and illustrator

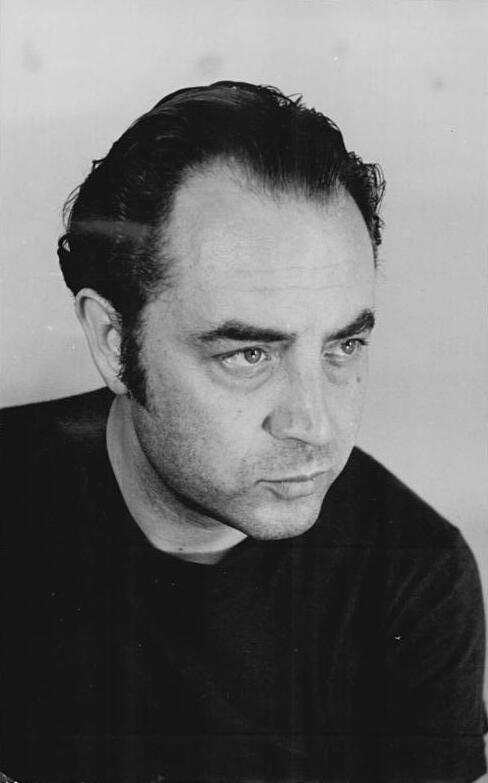
- Bert Heller 1951
- Born: 30 March 1912; Aachen, Germany
- Died: 29 April 1970 (aged 58); East Berlin, East Germany
- Occupations: Painter and illustrator Academy Rector

Bert Heller (30 March 1912 – 29 April 1970) was a German painter and illustrator who for two years in the later 1950s served as Rector of the Fine Arts Academy in the Weissensee district of Berlin. Heller's reputation as an artist is based primarily on his portraits, water colours and posters.

== Life ==
Bert Heller was born in Aachen, where in 1927 he enrolled for three years as a student at the Fine Arts Academy (as the institution was known at the time). One of his teachers was Anton Wendling. On completing his three years at the academy he undertook a study tour that took in the Netherlands, Belgium and Austria, before embarking on a career as a freelance artist based in Laurensberg (Aachen), very close to Germany's Dutch frontier. He also produced some high-profile murals. January 1933 brought régime change and the Hitler government lost little time in imposing one-party government in Germany. Bert Heller joined the ruling Nazi Party in 1940. Between 1940 and 1942 he studied under Hermann Kaspar at the Munich Fine Arts Academy. During the closing years of the war he undertook artwork commissions in connection with some of the architectural projects that were a feature of the time and place.

In 1946 Heller took a teaching post at the Arts Academy in Wernigerode, which in 1945 had ended up in the Soviet occupation zone within what remained of Germany. He remained at Wernigerode till 1950. During this period he was also producing wall and table images and designs. He then became a scholar student (Meisterschüler) for painting, studying under Heinrich Ehmsen at the (East German) Academy of Arts in Berlin. In the meantime the occupation zone had been relaunched, in October 1949, as the Soviet sponsored German Democratic Republic (East Germany) and Heller joined the Socialist Unity Party (SED / Sozialistische Einheitspartei Deutschlands), the ruling political party in what had by now become his country's second one-party dictatorship. The period of study at the Academy of Arts was followed by a professorship of painting at the Academy for Visual and Applied Arts at Weissensee (Berlin), where between 1956 and 1958 he served as Rector in succession to Werner Laux. Heller's period as Rector ended suddenly, with his dismissal: it was later suggested that he had fallen foul of the authorities by siding with students' criticisms of "simple curriculum stuffing, that left no space for independent research choices and insights", according to the historian Hiltrud Ebert. "He struggled against the mental narrowness at the academy, and rebelled in the face of uniformity". Heller's appointment to the academy's top job had come in the wake of the "political thaw" announced in 1955, but his dismissal two years later was an indication that the thaw was powerfully circumscribed by the enduring requirements of The Party.

Between 1958 and his death in 1970 Bert Heller worked as a freelance artist in Berlin. He had never officially been disgraced and appears to have been at least partially rehabilitated following his removal from the academic establishment, and was permitted to visit China for a study tour in 1963.

== Awards and honours ==
- 1951: National Prize of East Germany
- 1963: Arts Prize of the Trades Union Federation
- 1964: National Prize of East Germany
- 1965: Fellowship of the Academy of Arts
