= Ilse Essers =

German engineer

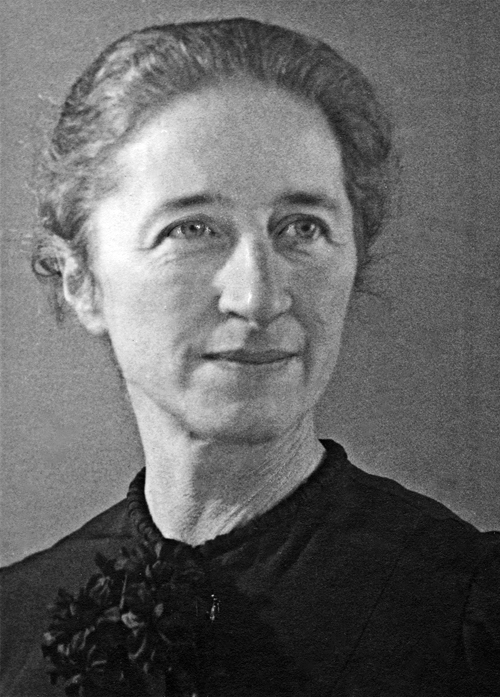
- Born: 24 September 1898; Munich, German Empire
- Died: 18 February 1994 (aged 95); Aachen, Germany
- Education: Doctorate

Ilse Essers (24 September 1898–18 February 1994), was a German engineer who established essential foundations in the field of aeronautical engineering.

== Biography ==
Ilse Essers was born Ilse Kober in 1898. She was the daughter of Anne Boeltz and Theodore Kober who worked on the Zeppelin airship. Before going to college, Essers established a new method for calculating measures against the buckling of steel girders.

She studied physics in Munich before moving on to study engineering in Aachen and graduated in 1926. Essers moved to Berlin where she worked in the aerodynamics department of the Aviation Research Institute. While there Essers discovered how the balance on flaps and rudders affected wing vibrations. She was the first woman awarded a doctorate in mechanical engineering there for her research in 1929.

Essers married Ernst Essers in 1929 and had four children after 1930. She continued to work and write. She wrote an autobiography and a series of books on the pioneers of science. Essers moved several times from Kiel in 1929 to Berlin in 1944 and Radolfzell on Lake Constance before returning to Aachen in 1946. She died in Aachen in 1994.

An award in her name is given out each year to women students. Ilse-Essers-Strasse is a street in Munich named for her.

== Bibliography ==
- Max Valier - A pioneer of space travel
- Hermann Ganswindt
- Investigation of wing vibrations in the wind tunnel
- Technology on my life path: as a woman and engineer in the early days of aviation technology
- From airship to glider: an overview of the beginnings of flight technology
