= Otto Müller (painter) =

German painter

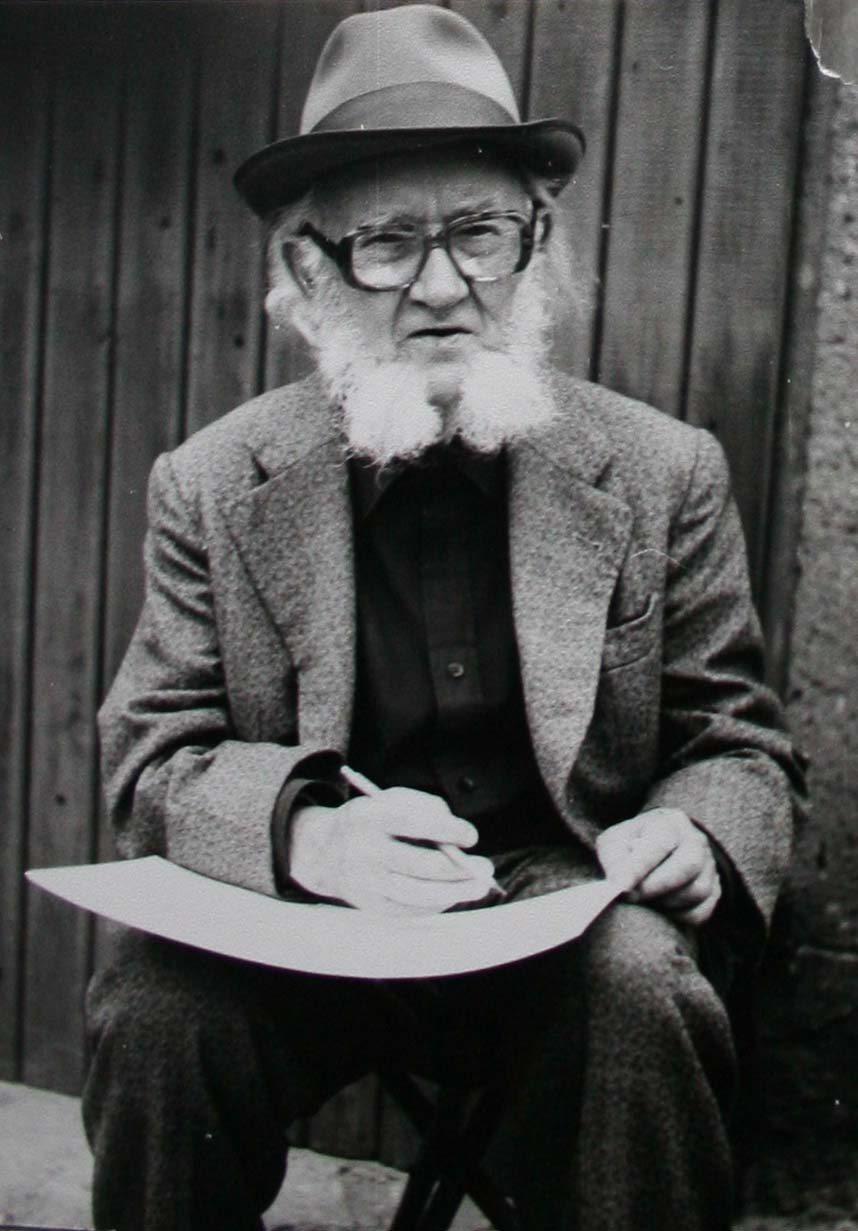
Otto Müller working on a sketch in Halle, ca. 1975

Otto Müller (November 21, 1898 – December 9, 1979) was a German painter and graphic designer.

== Life and work ==
=== Parental home ===
Otto Müller was born on November 21, 1898, in Cröllwitz, which since 1900 was a part of the city of Halle, Saxony-Anhalt. He was the child of the engine driver Otto Müller (1874–1951) and his wife Anna (1876–1923). He had one brother and two sisters.

=== Education ===
Otto Müller went to train as a lithographer from 1913 to 1917. During the First World War in 1918, he was called up to serve on the Western Front in France.

In 1919, he started studying painting at the Kunstgewerbeschule Burg Giebichenstein (Burg Giebichenstein Academy of Arts and Crafts), in Halle, where he was a student of Professor Erwin Hahs (1887–1970), and from 1927 on of Professor Charles Crodel. During this period, he formed friendships with fellow students Paul Zilling (1900–1953), Helmut Schröder (1910–1974) and Kurt Bunge (1911–1998).

In 1929, he sat and passed the painter's trade examination with the stage decorator O. Möllhoff in Halle.

=== Professional and family life 1930–1945 ===
In 1930, Otto Müller entered employment in the paint factory at the "Technische Chemikalien- und Compagnie GmbH" in Halle as a laboratory technician and departmental manager. In 1936, he married Senta-Luise Demmer. They had two children.

From 1941 to 1945, he worked as a draughtsman at the Siebel aircraft plant in Halle.

=== Professional and family life 1945–1963 ===
In 1945, Otto Müller began working as a self-employed painter and graphic designer in Halle. In 1946, he became a member of the Artists Association of the Democratic Republic of Germany – known in German as "Verband Bildender Künstler" (VBK). Otto Müller was a member of a Halle-based group of artists, known as "Die Fähre" (The Ferryboat - 1947–1949).

In 1948, he took part in an exhibition at the Henning Gallery in Halle, together with Charles Crodel, Kurt Bunge and Karl Rödel (1907–1982). His contributions to the exhibition caused Richard Horn to describe Otto Müller as “the most interesting of the four artists in the exhibition” in the introduction to the exhibition catalogue.

With three graphic works from 1947, Otto Müller was represented at the "Gesamtdeutsche Graphik-Ausstellung" (German Graphic Exhibition) organised by the German Cultural Council in Munich and held in the State Gallery and the Lenbach Gallery.

In the 50s and 60s, he worked in workshops in agriculture, mining and industry, e.g. in the engineering works in Halle, where he produced an oil painting known as „Der Maschinenformer“ (the engine builder), now owned by the Moritzburg foundation at the Kunstmuseum des Landes Sachsen-Anhalt (State Art Museum of Saxony-Anhalt) in Halle.

=== Later works 1963–1979 ===
On the occasion of his 65th birthday, Otto Müller was awarded the Art Award of the City of Halle for his lifetime artistic accomplishments and for his tile paintings in the “Frohe Zukunft” school. An exhibition of his works was also held to mark this occasion at the State Gallery in Moritzburg, now the Kunstmuseum Moritzburg Halle (Saale).

On December 9, 1979, he died in the Carl von Basedow clinic in Merseburg.

== Exhibitions ==
His works were shown in many exhibitions during his lifetime. The following is a selection of these:

- 1928: Exhibition of Müller's work from his school days at the Roter Turm in Halle
- 1948: Represented at the exhibition “Die Welt im Schleier der Farbe: Carl Crodel, Kurt Bunge, Otto Müller, Karl Rödel” at the Galerie Henning in Halle
- 1949: Exhibition of animal drawings and paintings by Müller, organised by Die Fähre
- 1956: Represented at the Gesamtdeutsche Graphik-Ausstellung (German Graphic Exhibition) organised by the German Cultural Council in Munich and held in the State Gallery and the Lenbach Gallery
- 1963–1964: Exhibition of his works from throughout his lifetime at the State Gallery in Moritzburg on the occasion of his 65th birthday
- 1968: Exhibition at the kleine Galerie in Halle on the occasion of his 70th birthday
- 1976: Exhibition in the Carl von Basedow clinic in Merseburg
- 1977: Opening of the State Gallery on the Hansering in Halle with exhibition of works by Müller.
- 1978–1979: Exhibition in the Galerie Marktschlößchen in Halle on the occasion of this 80th birthday
- 1979–1980: Represented at the “Kunst aus der DDR, Bezirk Halle” (Art from the GDR, region Halle) exhibition in the Kunstverein Hannover
