= Michael Reisch =

German artist and photographer

Michael Reisch (born 1964) is a German artist and photographer. Reisch exhibited nationally and internationally. His works are included in collections worldwide, including the Los Angeles County Museum of Art, USA and National Gallery of Scotland Edinburgh, Scotland. His works combine aspects of documentary photography, painting and sculpture. He lives in Düsseldorf.

== Early life and education ==
Reisch was born in Aachen. He studied at "Stadsacademie voor toegepaste Kunsten" Maastricht in 1985 and at Gerrit Rietveld Academie, Amsterdam 1986 – 91. 1991 he was enrolled in postgraduate studies at Kunstakademie Düsseldorf with Bernd Becher.

== Career ==
In 1990 Reisch was Artist in Residence at the Foundation Cartier in Paris. He created a series of works, "architectures", between 1991 and 2004, which depict mainly architecture of the 1970s. In 2002 he received a scholarship from the Foundation Kunst und Kultur des Landes Nordrheinwestfalen. Between 2002 and 2006, Reisch worked on a body of work titled "landscapes". His second group of works, "new landscapes", were created from 2007 to 2010, after he received a scholarship from Stiftung Kunstfonds in Bonn. Since 2010 Reisch has combined fully digitally generated abstract works with landscape photography in his exhibitions.

Reisch's works are large-sized photographs, often highly processed by digital editing techniques. He uses these techniques to erase civilizing signs and marks from the buildings photographed.

== Solo exhibitions (extract) ==
- 2001: Räume für neue Kunst, Rolf Hengesbach, Wuppertal
- 2005: Galerie Rolf Hengesbach, Köln
- 2006: Fotomuseum im Stadtmuseum, München
- 2007: Scottish National Portrait Gallery, Edinburgh, Scotland
- 2007: Städtische Galerie Wolfsburg
- 2007: Landesgalerie am Landesmuseum Oberösterreich, Linz, Österreich
- 2008: Kunsthalle Erfurt
- 2010: Galerie Hengesbach, Berlin
- 2011: Bischoff/Weiss Gallery, London, GB
- 2012: Peter Lav Gallery, Kopenhagen, Denmark

== Group exhibitions (extract) ==
- 1996: … wie gemalt, Neuer Aachener Kunstverein
- 2002: Zwischen Konstruktion und Wirklichkeit, Landschaft in der zeitgenössischen deutschen Fotografie, Suermondt-Ludwig-Museum, Aachen
- 2003: Modellierte Wirklichkeiten, Landesgalerie am Landesmuseum Oberösterreich Linz, Österreich
- 2004: Gezähmte Natur, Brandenburgische Kunstsammlungen, Cottbus
- 2008: Architecture-Biennale Venice, Italien, with brandlhuber+
- 2009: Landscape, contemporary, Dr. Robert-Gerlich-Museum, Burghausen
- 2010: Realismus – Das Abenteuer der Wirklichkeit, Kunsthalle der Hypo-Kulturstiftung, Munich, Germany; Kunsthalle Emden; Kunsthal Rotterdam, Niederlande
- 2011: Alpenlandschaft-Sehnsuchtsort und Bühne, Residenzgalerie, Salzburg, Österreich
- 2011: Section "Romantic Camera", Permanent Collection, National Portrait Gallery, Edinburgh, Scotland
- 2011: Shifting Realities, Scheublein Fine Art, Zürich, Schweiz
- 2012: Unbestimmtheitstellen, Kunstraum Alexander Bürkle, Freiburg
- 2013: Romantic Camera, Edinburgh

== Publications (extract) ==
- 2006: Michael Reisch, monograph, 124 pages, Hatje Cantz Publishers, Ostfildern, Germany, ISBN 3-7757-1848-6, ISBN 978-3-7757-1848-6
- 2010: New Landscapes, monograph, 100 pages, Hatje Cantz Publishers, Ostfildern, Germany, ISBN 978-3-7757-2635-1
- 2013: Selected Works, monograph, 96 pages, Kerber Publishers, Bielefeld, Germany, ISBN 978-3-86678-903-6

== Literature ==
- Wolf Lieser: Digital Art, hard-back: 287 pages, Publisher: h.f.ullmann publishing (20 March 2009), ISBN 3833153377, ISBN 978-3833153372
