= Giebichenstein Castle =

Castle in Halle, Saxony-Anhalt, Germany

Coordinates: 51°30′10″N 11°57′14″E

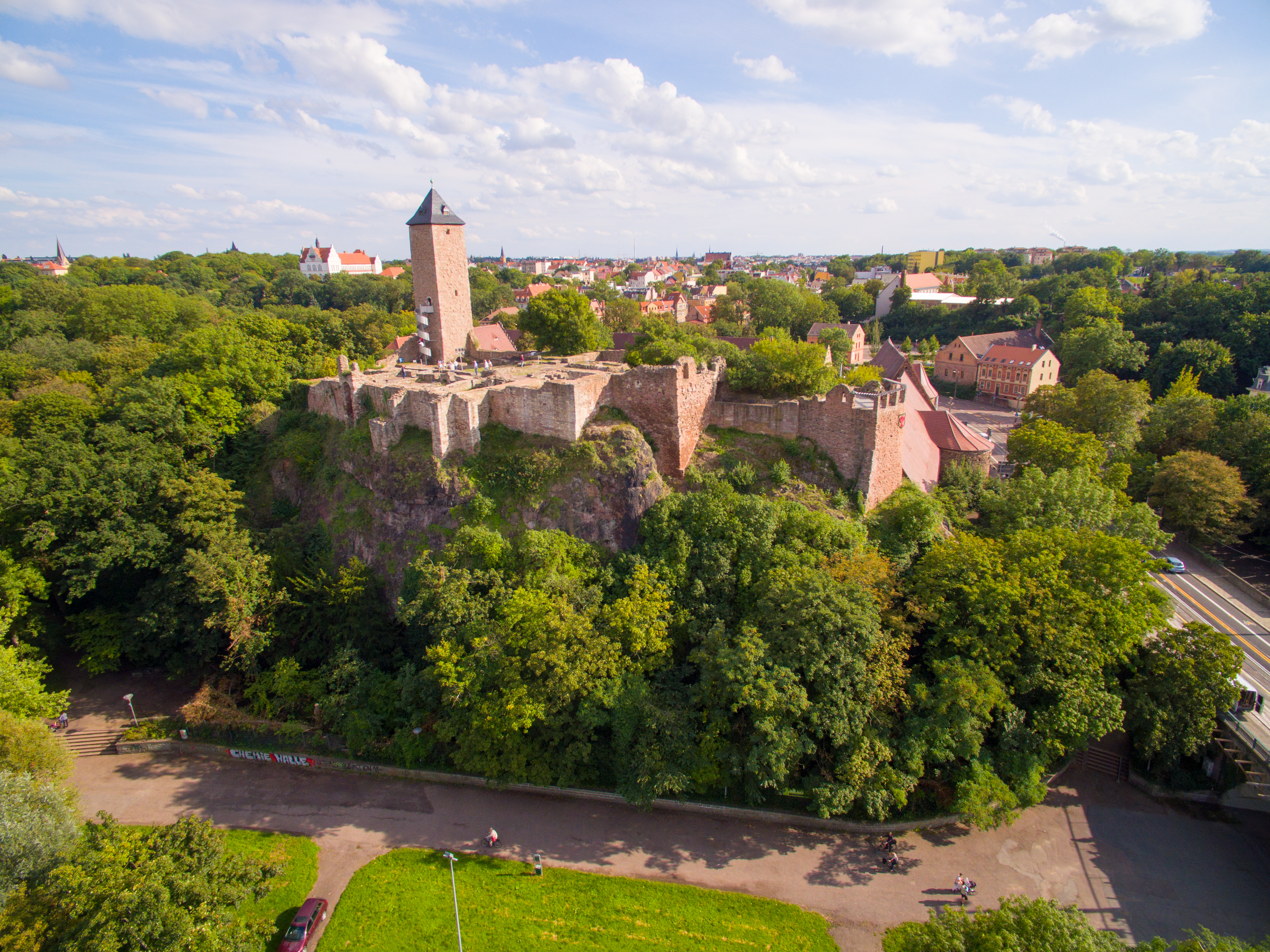
Giebichenstein Castle

Giebichenstein Castle (German: Burg Giebichenstein) is a castle in Giebichenstein district of Halle (Saale) in Saxony-Anhalt, Germany. It is part of the Romanesque Road (Strasse der Romanik).

Being a Burgward in the 9th century, the castle became a royal residence of Otto I, Holy Roman Emperor, who gave it to the Archbishopric of Magdeburg which he had established in 968.

Giebichenstein Castle served as the place of death or lying in state for three bishops: Bishop Adalbert in 981, Bishop Tagino in 1012, and later that same year, Bishop Walthard. In addition, Giebichenstein was used by King (later Emperor) Henry II as a state prison for members of the high nobility. Among the imprisoned were such notable figures as Henry of Schweinfurt (in 1004), Ezzo of Este (1014–1018), Ernest of Swabia (1027–1029), and Godfrey the Bearded. According to legend, the Thuringian Landgrave Louis the Springer, founder of the Ludovingian dynasty, was also imprisoned at Giebichenstein, although there is no historical evidence to support this.

The significance of the castle is further emphasized by the presence of Henry IV at Giebichenstein in 1064. In 1157, Frederick I Barbarossa convened an assembly of princes at the castle.

The decisive transformation of Giebichenstein from a burgward to a sovereign territory of the Archbishopric of Magdeburg took place under Archbishop Wichmann (1154–1192). Wichmann issued several charters at Giebichenstein starting in 1154. The oldest excavated wall remains on the upper castle also date from this period. A cohesive construction project on the previously undeveloped rocky outcrop included a gate tower, a curtain wall, and a southern tower. In addition to the narrow entrance through the massive Romanesque gate tower, there was apparently a second entrance on the eastern side. Another tower stood on the southern side.

In 1215, King Frederick II is said to have besieged Giebichenstein Castle. Historians attribute the cause to the conflict over the German throne between Frederick II and Otto IV of the Welf dynasty. At that time, Archbishop Albert I of Käfernburg had sided with the Welfs. The outcome of the fighting is unknown, but around that time Otto IV lost his remaining allies and was forced to abandon his claims to the throne.

Halle had practically reached a state of political autonomy in 1263. The same happened with Magdeburg and when the archbishops finally left Magdeburg, after a series of conflicts with the ever more powerful city council, Giebichenstein Castle became their principal residence in 1382, which it remained until the archbishops moved into the newly built Moritzburg (Halle) in 1503.

== The lower castle ==
Under Archbishops Günther II and Friedrich III, the lower castle (German: Unterburg) was built between 1445 and 1464. Prior to this, Günther II had sold the castles of Bad Lauchstädt, Liebenau, and Schkopau to finance the construction. No archaeological evidence of a predecessor to the lower castle has been found; however, it is assumed that an outer bailey or an economic courtyard must have existed for such an important castle. The curtain wall with flanking towers, the moat, and the inner perimeter buildings were constructed as part of a unified building project. Only the eastern curtain wall, apart from the gatehouse, remained free of buildings. During the reign of Archbishop Johannes, the granary (Kornhaus) was built, standing freely in the castle courtyard.

As early as around 1500, the residential buildings were repurposed for economic use: the brewhouse was added to the south side of the west wing of the lower castle, and the Mushaus at the northern end was converted into a distillery. In 1706, the baroque manor house (Herrenhaus) was constructed on the eastern side of the lower castle. Administrator Ochs had a stone bridge built — a predecessor of today's Giebichenstein Bridge — and transformed the moat and old castle grounds into a park.

The lower castle is one of the two campuses of the Burg Giebichenstein Kunsthochschule Halle (Burg Giebichenstein University of Art and Design). Founded in 1915, the university saw itself as an alternative to the Bauhaus (founded in 1919), with a somewhat stronger focus on craftsmanship. However, it also cooperated with the Royal Porcelain Manufactory in Berlin (KPM), which established an experimental studio in Halle.
