= Christian Eduard Boettcher =

German painter (1818–1889)

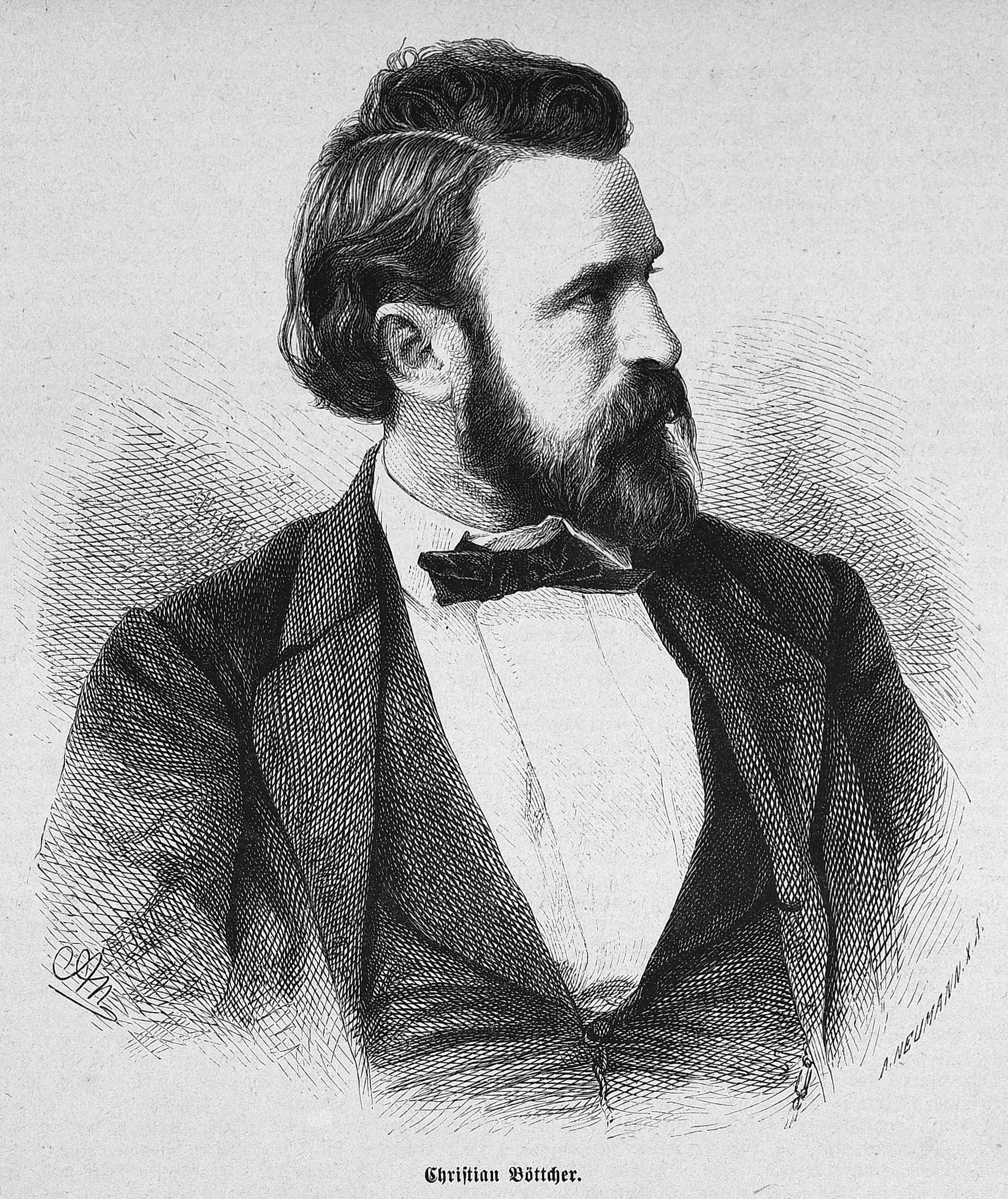
- Christian Eduard Boettcher 1871
- Born: 9 December 1818; Imgenbroich
- Died: 15 June 1889 (aged 70); Düsseldorf
- Occupation: painter

Christian Eduard Boettcher, or Böttcher ( 9 December 1818 – 15 June 1889), was a German painter whose work comprised portraiture and genre painting.

== Career ==
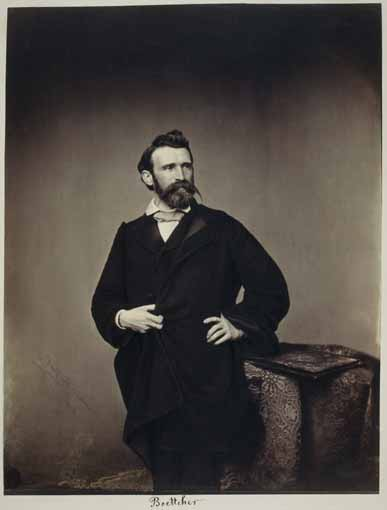
Christian Eduard Böttcher by Franz Seraph Hanfstaengl (1858)

Boettcher was born in Imgenbroich. He first attended the State Academy of Fine Arts Stuttgart under Johann Heinrich von Dannecker from 1833 to 1838 and trained as a lithographer, working as such for the Ebner'sche Verlagshaus (Ebner's publishing house), in Stuttgart and for the Arnz & Comp. lithographic institute in Düsseldorf.

From 1844 to 1849 he studied at the Düsseldorf Art Academy under the history painter Theodor Hildebrandt and in the master class of Friedrich Wilhelm von Schadow. After completing his studies, he settled in Düsseldorf. In 1848 he was one of the founding members of the Malkasten artists' association, of which he was a member of the board for a time. He was a member of the Verein der Düsseldorfer Künstler (Association of Düsseldorf Artists), and the academic association, Orient. Boettcher was appointed professor at the Düsseldorf and Academy of Arts in 1872. He died in 1889 in Düsseldorf.

== Artistic activity ==
In his work Boettcher concentrated primarily on figurative paintings, initially preferring - under the influence of landscape painter Carl Wilhelm Hübner - socially critical themes, for example with the paintings Der Blinde und sein Führer (1845) and Die Entlassung des Gefangenen (1848). In the 1860s and 70s, he produced paintings that combine the depiction of people, towns and landscapes on the Rhine between Bingen and Cologne, and whose subjects are occasionally in the tradition of painter and graphic artist Adolph Schroedter. Deviating from the latter's often satirical and critical approach, however, Boettcher's popular compositions emphasise a late Romantic sentimental mood, for example in Haymaking on the Rhine (1856) as well as Evening on the Rhine (1860) and Summer Night on the Rhine (1862) both of which show identifiable Düsseldorf artists in front of an inn, and Rhenish Harvest near Sinzig (1864). Further paintings include The Tourist on the Rhine (1865), presumably showing the painter Adolf Seel, Country House on the Rhine (1866), Excerpt for the Grape Harvest (1867), At the Market Fountain of a Rhenish Town (1870), and Rhine Journey at the Loreley (1880).

Boettcher as portrait painter and draughtsman is depicted, among others, within portrait drawings of the painters Carl Gottfried Eybe and Hermann Werner. His own portrait was painted by Ernst Bosch, and another by Adolf Line, and also a caricature, are held by the Malkasten artists' association in Düsseldorf.

Lithographs after his works were published in the Düsseldorfer Künstleralben (Düsseldorf Artists' Albums) and in the Sammlung von Lithographien nach Genrebildern Düsseldorfer Künstler (Collection of lithographs after genre paintings by Düsseldorf artists), with his wood engravings in many illustrated sheets of the time.

== Significant works ==
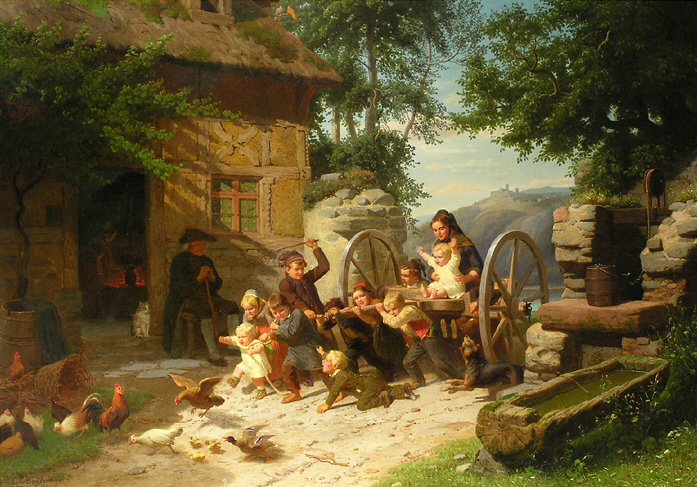
Children's play on the farm (1857)

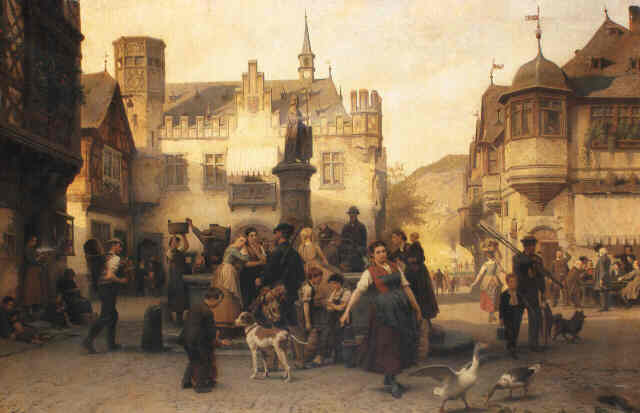
At the market fountain in Bingen (1870)

- Heinrich Ed. Anschütz als Marquis Posa in Schillers ‚Don Carlos‘ (1840): Munich, Theatermuseum
- Der Blinde und sein Führer (1845)
- Portrait of Amalie Wolff, spätere Frau von Benkraths (1847): Krefeld, Kaiser Wilhelm Museum
- Entlassung eines Gefangenen (1848)
- Portrait of Frau Wilhelm Beissel (1849)
- Nach der Schlacht (1851)
- Heimkehr vom Schulfest / Maitag (1852): Bonn, Rheinisches Landesmuseum
- Der strafende Schuhmacher (1853)
- Portrait of Mathilde Mollier, geb. von Franqué (1853)
- Sommerabend am Rhein (1855)
- Heuernte an der Lahn (1856)
- Kinderkonzert (1857)
- Abend am Rhein (1860)
- Rheinische Ernte (1861)
- Herbstabend (1861)
- Sommernacht am Rhein (1862): Cologne, Wallraf–Richartz Museum
- Abend im Schwarzwald (1863): Leipzig, Kunstmuseum
- Rheinische Dorfjugend (1863)
- Sommermorgen am Rhein (1864)
- Auf der Wanderschaft (1865)
- Auszug zur Weinlese (1866)
- Glückliche Menschen in der Hütte und Glückliche Menschen im Palast (1866)
- Am Marktbrunnen einer rheinischen Stadt (1870)
- Landhaus am Rhein (1870)
- Heimkehr vom Feld (1872)
- Rheinischer Schieferdecker (1874)
- Sonntag am Rhein (1875)
- Blick auf Burg Katz und die Loreley (1876): Bonn, Sammlung Rheinromantik (Rhine Romanticism Collection)
- Mutterglück (1877)
- Blick von Muffendorf bei Bonn auf das Siebengebirge (1877): Bonn, Sammlung Rheinromantik
- Überfahrt an der Loreley (1880): Bonn, Sammlung Rheinromantik
- Der Rhein bei Rolandseck (1882): Bonn, Sammlung Rheinromantik
- Des Köhlers Abendgebet (1884)
- Oberwesel mit Schönburg (1884): Bonn, Rheinisches Landesmuseum
- Oberwesel (1888): Bonn, Sammlung Rheinromantik
- St. Goar und Goarshausen am Rhein (1885)
- Dausenau bei Ems (1887)
- Leutesdorf mit Andernach am Rhein (1888)
- Portrait of Frl. Bertha von Stadman, the Besselich house in Vallendar
- Portrait of Leonhard Rausch, Düsseldorf, Malkasten Artists' Association
- Portrait of August Beck, Düsseldorf, Malkasten Artists' Association
- Portrait of Bünker, Düsseldorf, Malkasten Artists' Association
- Portrait of Theodor Mintrop
- Portrait of Josef Gotthard Lossen (1795–1866), Portrait of Maria Anna Lossen, born Cathrein (1806–1887) and Portrait of Maximilian Lossen

== Further reading and sources ==
- Daelen, Eduard; "Böttcher, Christian Eduard" in Allgemeine Deutsche Biographie (ADB), vol 47, p. 142, Duncker & Humblot, Leipzig 1903.
- Die Künstler aller Zeiten und Völker; vol 1, Stuttgart 1857, Friedrich Müller (ed.)
- Von Boetticher, Friedrich (art historian); Malerwerke des 19. Jahrhunderts. Beitrag zur Kunstgeschichte vol I, 2, Dresden 1891–1901.
- Vollmer, Hans (art historian); Boettcher, Christian Eduard, (ed.) Felix Becker, vol 4, p. 210, Thieme-Becker
- Allgemeines Künstlerlexikon. Leben und Werke der berühmtesten bildenden Künstler; vol 1, Hermann Alexander Müller (compiled), Hans Wolfgang Singer (ed.), Literarische Anstalt Rütten & Loening, Frankfurt (1921)
- Rosenberg, Adolf; Aus der Düsseldorfer Malerschule. Studien und Skizzen. Leipzig 1889, p. 36.
- Schaarschmidt, Friedrich; Zur Geschichte der Düsseldorfer Kunst insbesondere im XIX. Jahrhundert, p. 179, Düsseldorf 1902
- Rheinische Malerei in der Biedermeierzeit; p. 89, Karl Koetschau (ed.), Düsseldorf 1926
- Hundert Jahre Künstlerverein Malkasten Düsseldorf 1848–1948; p. 19, Düsseldorf 1948
- Immel, Ute; Die deutsche Genremalerei im 19. Jahrhundert; Heidelberg University (dissertation) 1967, p. 288
- Hütt, Wolfgang; Die Düsseldorfer Malerschule. 1819–1869, Leipzig 1995
- Quellen zur Geschichte des Künstlervereins Malkasten. Ein Zentrum bürgerlicher Kunst und Kultur in Düsseldorf seit 1848, Sabine Schroyen (ed.), Cologne 1992.
- Meisterwerke der Düsseldorfer Malerschule, Hans Paffrath (ed.), Düsseldorf 1995
- Michael, Meinhard; "Boettcher, Christian Eduard" in Die Bildenden Künstler aller Zeiten und Völker (The visual artists of all times and peoples), vol. 12, Allgemeines Künstlerlexikon, Saur, Munich 1995
- Lexikon der Düsseldorfer Malerschule 1819–1918, vol 1, pp. 154–158, Hans Paffrath (ed.), Kunstmuseum Düsseldorf im Ehrenhof and Galerie Paffrath, Bruckmann, Munich 1997,
- Weiß, Siegfried (art historian); "Christian Eduard Böttcher – Rheinromantik mit Düsseldorfer Malern", in Weltkunst, Issue 1, 1. January 1998
