= Edwin Werner =

German musicologist

- Born: 1940 (age 84–85); Wrocław, Silesia
- Education: Studied musicology and Germanistik (1959–1964); Diploma in musicology (1964); Doctorate (Dr. phil., 1981) – Georg Friedrich Händel's Trauer-Anthem HWV 264
- Alma mater: Martin-Luther-University Halle-Wittenberg
- Occupation(s): Musicologist, Handel scholar
- Known for: Director of Handel House (1982–2005), Handel iconography
- Awards: Obermuseumsrat (1986); Handel Prize of the Bezirk Halle (1986); Ehrenpräsident des Landesmusikrats Sachsen-Anhalt (2005); Bundesverdienstkreuz am Bande (2006); Honorary member of Georg-Friedrich-Händel-Gesellschaft (2015); Honorary member of the Friends and Supporters' Circle of the Handel House in Halle e.V. (2017)

Edwin Werner (born 1940) is a German musicologist and Handel scholar.

== Life ==
Born in Wrocław, Werner comes from Silesia. After he passed his Abitur in Ballenstedt in the Kreis Quedlinburg, he studied musicology and Germanistik at the Martin-Luther-University Halle-Wittenberg from 1959 until his diploma in 1964. His academic teachers included et al. Max Schneider and Walther Siegmund-Schultze. From 1964 to 1967 he worked as music dramaturg at the Theater Eisleben.

Afterwards (1967) he became deputy director of the Handel House in Halle (Saale) under Konrad Sasse. In 1981, Bernd Baselt awarded him a doctorate A as Dr. phil. with the work Georg Friedrich Händel's Trauer-Anthem" HWV 264. A study with a critical edition of the score in the context of the Hallische Händel-Ausgabe. From 1982 to 2005, he succeeded Sasse as director of the Music Museum, which he established as an internationally important institution. For the "Bach-Händel-Schütz-Ehrung der DDR" (Bach-Händel-Schütz-Ehrung of the GDR) he designed the extension of the Hände-Haus by three buildings in the 1980s. After the fall of the Berlin Wall, he advocated the creation of a "Händel quarter". Under his auspices, the first recordings of Handel music were published, and he himself also appeared as organist.

Werner published Sasse's revised dissertation on Robert Franz and the series Schriften des Händelhauses in Halle, wrote the museum guide and continued the Handel bibliography. He was also a lecturer for organology at the Martin-Luther-University Halle-Wittenberg. He is considered a leading expert in the field of Handel iconography. He contributed to the Händel-Jahrbuch (2008) and the Cambridge Handel Encyclopedia (2009) and was author of the authoritative publication Handel Portraits in the Collections of the Handel House Foundation (2013).

At the Handel Prize in Halle (Saale) he was jointly responsible for the programme design. From 1983 to 2011 he was a member of the board of the international Georg-Friedrich-Händel-Gesellschaft, which appointed him honorary member in 2015. In 1990 he also initiated the Friends and Sponsorship Association of the Handel House in Halle e.V. After his active time in the museum, he worked as an advisor to the board and as a member of the advisory board. He also wrote articles and literary editor for the association's Mitteilungen, which he established in 1991 as the Händel-Hausmitteilungen.

In 1994, Werner co-founded the "Ständige Konferenz Mitteldeutsche Barockmusik e.V.", which has since been renamed the Central German Baroque Music in Saxony, Saxony-Anhalt and Thuringia. He was also co-founder of the Hallesche Musikrat and from 1990 to 2004 founding president of the Landesmusikrat Sachsen-Anhalt. He later became its honorary president. From 1993 to 1997, he was also chairman of the Länderrat (Konferenz der Landesmusikräte) in the Deutscher Musikrat. From 2003 to 2009, he was a member of the Rundfunkrat des Mitteldeutschen Rundfunks, and he was also a member of the ARD programme advisory board.

== Awards ==
- Title "Obermuseumsrat" (1986)
- Handel Prize of the Bezirk Halle (1986)
- Ehrenpräsident des Landesmusikrats Sachsen-Anhalt (2005)
- Bundesverdienstkreuz am Bande (2006)
- Honorary member of the Georg-Friedrich-Händel-Gesellschaft e.V. (2015)
- Honorary member of the Friends and Supporters' Circle of the Handel House in Halle e.V. (2017)

== Publications ==
- Beiträge zur Forschung über Leben und Werk von Robert Franz 1815–1892 (Schriften des Händelhauses in Halle. Vol. 4). Handel House, Halle an der Saale 1986 – bearbeitet und herausgegeben.
- Händel-Bildnisse in den Sammlungen der Stiftung Händel-Haus (Mitteilungen des Freundes- und Förderkreises des Händel-Hauses zu Halle. Sonderheft 2013). Freundes- und Förderkreis des Händel-Hauses zu Halle, Halle (Saale) 2013, ISBN 978-3-930550-98-2 – zusammengestellt und bearbeitet.
- Das Händel-Haus in Halle. Führer durch die Händel-Ausstellung und Geschichte des Händel-Hauses. 5. veränderte Auflage, Händel-Haus, Halle (Saale) 2007, ISBN 978-3-910019-24-9.
