= Hans-Jürgen Steinmann =

German writer (1928–2008)

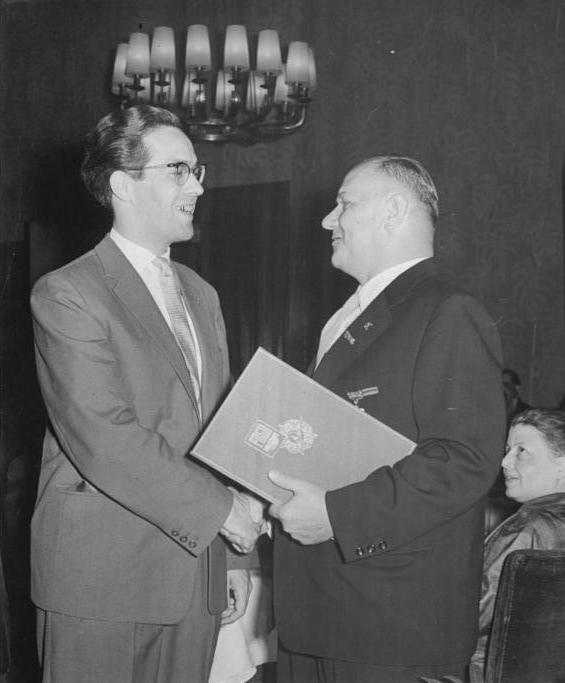
Walter Buchheim (right) presents Steinman the 1960 literature prize of the FDGB for his novel Die größere Liebe.

Hans-Jürgen Steinmann (4 September 1929 in Żagań, Province of Lower Silesia – 22 September 2008 in Halle (Saale)) was a German writer. In 1979 he was awarded the Handel Prize.

== Works ==
- Brücke ins Leben, Berlin 1953
- Die Fremde, Halle (Saale) 1959
- Die größere Liebe, Berlin 1959
- Stimmen der Jahre, Berlin 1963
- Über die Grenze, Berlin 1963
- Von all unseren Kameraden ..., Halle 1967 (together with Roswitha Berndt and Ewald Buchsbaum)
- Analyse H., Berlin 1968
- Träume und Tage, Halle (Saale) 1970
- Zwei Schritte vor dem Glück, Halle 1978
- Halle, Halle-Neustadt, Leipzig 1979 (together with Gerald Große)
- Merseburg, Leipzig 1980 (together with Gerald Große)
- Eisleben, Leipzig 1983 (together with Eberhard Klöppel)
- Quedlinburg, Leipzig 1988 (together with Karl-Heinz Böhle)
- Erlebtes – Erfahrenes – Ungedrucktes, Halle 1998
