= Kefersteinia =

Kefersteinia may refer to:

- Kefersteinia (polychaete), a polychaete genus in the family Hesionidae
- Kefersteinia (plant), a plant genus in the family Orchidaceae
