= Alfred Hetschko =

Austro-German music educator, and composer

Alfred Paul Hetschko (24 August 1898 – 18 April 1967) was an Austro-German music educator, Kapellmeister and composer, who rendered outstanding services to men's choir. From 1952 to 1955, he was director of the Staatliche Hochschule für Theater und Musik Halle.

== Life ==
=== Austrian-Silesian origins and musical studies ===
Hetschko was born in the Austrian Silesia town of Bielitz, which was located on the Galician border. After primary school (1904–1909), he attended the K. K. Emperor Franz Joseph State Grammar School in the Moravian district town of Ostrava. After passing his school-leaving examination (Matura) in 1916 at the Protestant Lehrerbildungsanstalt in Bielitz, he served in the First World War as a soldier in the Österreichisches Heer.

Afterwards he was first an elementary school teacher in Kunzendorf near Bielsko. From 1921 to 1923, he taught at the Protestant boys' school at Bielitz in the autonomous Voivodeship of Silesia. In parallel, he studied at the Charles University of Prague from 1918. In 1922, he acquired his teaching qualification for German and music at grammar schools. His academic teachers included Paul Nettl in music history, Heinrich Rietsch (Prague) and Adolf Chybiński (Lviv).

=== Professional stations in areas with a German minority ===
==== Music teacher and choirmaster in Lemberg and Graudenz (1922-1932) ====
From 1922 he taught at the German Realgymnasium in Lemberg (Lwiw) in the Lwów Voivodeship. Hetschko, who had passed his Kapellmeister examination at the Lviv Academy of Music, additionally worked as a guest conductor at orchestral concerts of the Türk Concert Directorate and the Polish Musicians' Association. In 1922 he also took over the direction of the Galician Germans men's chorus "Frohsinn" and, from 1923, of the independent German Men's Choral Society of Lviv. Hetschko also trained a women's choir and a mixed choir as well as smaller ensembles. He had works by classical, romantic and Baroque music composers performed in addition to Lied and folk songs by baroque composers, as well as singing an ecclesiastical programme. His activity inspired several choir foundations in the region.

He then became a music teacher in Grudziądz at the Goethe School. The predominantly Protestant student body, originating from West Prussia, was there educated to the German Volkstum and to loyal citizenship of the Polish state. From 1924 to 1932, Hetschko was music director and organist as well as conductor of the stage orchestra at the community theatre "Deutsche Bühne Graudenz", which was under the direction of Arnold Kriedte and had its seat in the former Protestant community hall. It was a replica of the stage in Bydgoszcz and was supported by the Berlin "Verein heimattreuer Graudenzer". At the age of 27 he was elected the first Bundeschormeister of the Bund deutscher Gesangsvereine Posen-Pommerellen. He was also director of the Singakademie in Graudenz, which merged with the men's singing society "Liedertafel" in 1930, with which he gave public concerts. Among others, he performed the oratorios Christ on the Mount of Olives by Ludwig van Beethoven (1927) and The Seasons by Joseph Haydn (1932). He also maintained a close exchange with his Polish colleagues, making music with the Graudenz Conservatory Director Ignaci Tomaszewski.

==== Headmaster in Czechoslovakia, Reich Protectorate (1932-1945) ====
In 1932, he went to Czechoslovakia: until 1933 he first worked as a choir and orchestra conductor in Brno. He was then a teacher at the German school in Košice, where he held the post of director in 1933/34. During this period, according to Rudolf Weidig, he openly opposed the aggressively nationalist politics of the Carpathian German Party and its sister party, the Carpathian German Party (KdP). In his estimation, the KdP suffered defeat in the 1937 Kashubian municipal election because of Hetschko's activities. The National Socialists had later accused and harassed him for that attitude and for other offences. On 1 July 1941 he joined the NSDAP (membership number 8,956,345) and belonged to the NSDAP-Ortsgruppe Česká Třebová (Reichsgau Sudetenland). He was also a member of the National Socialist Teachers League. From 1942 to 1945, Hetschko taught at the secondary school and teacher training college in Dvůr Králové nad Labem in the Protectorate of Bohemia and Moravia. With the end of the war in 1945 his forced resettlement to the West was a success.

=== Work in the SBZ and the GDR ===
==== Post-war period in the Harz Mountains (1945-1948) ====
In the Soviet occupation zone he was then entrusted with resettler welfare (Aschersleben) and agricultural surveys (Quedlinburg). He also organised cultural events. From 1946 to 1948, he was a theatre bandmaster and manager in Aschersleben. He founded the local district association of the Union of Art and the "Werk der Jugend". He also helped to constitute the impact group of the Cultural Association of the GDR.

==== Music adviser at ministerial level (1948-1952) ====
He was then appointed to Halle an der Saale as trade union secretary for music and theatre affairs. From 1 June 1948, he was head of the music department and Oberregierungsrat in the SED-led Ministry of Education of Saxony-Anhalt. Under his aegis, the reorganisation of school music took place, which among others led to the founding of music schools. In addition, in 1949 Hetschko received a teaching assignment at the Staatliche Hochschule für Theater und Musik Halle founded by Hans Stieber. In addition, he was deputy chairman of the Peace Council of the Landesregierung von Sachsen-Anhalt and Land Labour Judge.

In 1951/52, under Minister Paul Wandel, he was chief advisor for music in the Ministry of National Education of the GDR in East Berlin. From August to September 1951, he also served as the first head of the music department of the Staatliche Kommission für Kunstangelegenheiten, from which he resigned again at the end of 1951.

==== Management functions in higher education (from 1952) ====
He was given the directorship of the Halle Academy of Music in succession to Bernhard Bennedik with effect from 1 April 1952. During this time he was a promoter of Neue Musik in Halle. However, his commitment to school music led to the discontinuation of teaching at the conservatoire. After the institution was taken over by the Pädagogische Hochschule Halle-Köthen in 1955, he became Professor and head of the music department there (until 1963). Furthermore, from 1953 to 1960 (together with Helmut Mahler) and from 1961 to May 1965, he was the first chairman of the Halle district executive committee of the art trade union and deputy chairman of the Halle district executive committee of the Gesellschaft zur Verbreitung wissenschaftlicher Kenntnisse. Hetschko was also a board member of the Klub der Intelligenz in Halle. Hetschko, a member of the Socialist Unity Party of Germany, was a member of the federal executive committee of the Free German Trade Union Federation from 1955 to 1959 under Herbert Warnke.

Hetschko was the author of a biography of Antonín Dvořák (1965). He published articles in daily newspapers and specialist journals (among others Musik und Gesellschaft). He also occasionally appeared as a composer (songs, choirs). In particular, he composed works for male choir.

== Awards ==
In 1961, he was honoured with the Handel Prize of the Halle district. In 1963, he received the Patriotic Order of Merit in bronze. He was also a bearer of the Fritz Heckert Medaille of the Free German Trade Union Federation.

== Publications ==
- Antonín Dvořák. [Biografie]. Reclams Universal-Bibliothek. (Vol. 253). Reclam, Leipzig, 1965.
