= Handel Prize =

- Awarded for: "Exceptional artistic, academic or politico-cultural services as far as these are connected with the city of Halle's Handel commemoration"
- Sponsored by: The city of Halle
- Location: Halle
- Country: East Germany; Germany
- Rewards: Diploma, a gold and enamel badge

The Handel Prize (German: Händel-Preis) is an annual award, instituted in 1956, which is presented by the city of Halle, in Germany, in honour of the celebrated Baroque composer George Frideric Handel. It is awarded, "for exceptional artistic, academic or politico-cultural services as far as these are connected with the city of Halle's Handel commemoration". The prize consists of a diploma, a gold and enamel badge, (and until 2008 10,000 euros in prize money) and is presented during the annual Handel Festival, Halle.

== List of recipients ==
Source: Freundes- und Förderkreis des Händel-Hauses zu Halle e.V.

- 1956: Ensemble der "POROS"-Inszenierung, including Philine Fischer, Margarete Herzberg, Werner Enders, Helmuth Kaphahn, Kurt Hübenthal, Günther Leib, Franz Stumpf
- 1959: Orchester des Theaters des Friedens in Halle (Händel-Festspielorchester), Philine Fischer, Walther Siegmund-Schultze, Johanna Rudolph, Helmut Koch
- 1960: Heinz Beberniß, Willi Lautenschläger, Willi Neubert, Anneliese Pietschmann, Arno Rammelt, Werner Reinowsky, Konrad Sasse, Otto Schutzmeister, Arbeiterballett Buna, Arbeitertheater in Leuna, Staatliches Sinfonieorchester Halle
- 1961: Hans Pischner, William C. Smith, Percy Young, Horst-Tanu Margraf, Max Schneider, Albert Gabriel, Julie Harksen, Alfred Hetschko, Karl Erich Müller, Heinz Röttger, Kollektiv der Germanisten der Universität Halle, Dietrich Allert, Dieter Heinemann, Günter Hartung, Wolfgang Friedrich, Volkschor Halle
- 1962: Ernst Hermann Meyer, Alan Bush, Horst Förster, Gerhard Wohlgemuth, Jutta Bartels, Heinz Bräuer, Karl Kleinig, Erich Müller, Wilhelm Schmied, Dieter Streithof, Maria Vermes, Gerhard Voigt
- 1963: Kurt Hübenthal, Bernhard Franke, Hans Lorbeer, Werner Rackwitz, Kollektiv des Mitteldeutschen Verlages Halle, Ludwig Schuster Quartet: Ludwig Schuster, Georg Hanstedt, Walter Ziegler, Otto Kleist
- 1964: Wolfgang Hudy, Renate Krahmer, Hans-Martin Nau, Heinz Rückert, Isolde Schubert, Willy Sitte, Werner Steinberg, Collegium instrumentale Halle
- 1965: Jens Peter Larsen, Hans Stieber, Oswald Arlt, Fritz Bressau, Rose Maria Kuban, Gerhard Lichtenfeld, Gerd Neglik, Gertrud Sasse, Martin Wetzel, Kabarett "Die Taktlosen"
- 1966: Claus Haake, Hans-Joachim Mrusek, Orchestra of the Anhaltisches Theater, Heinz Röttger and Edi Weeber-Fried (im Kollektiv)
- 1967: Washa Gwacharija, Richard Paulick (alias Peter Winsloe), Rosemarie Streithof, Kollektiv des Amateurfilmstudios des Elektrochemischen Kombinats Bitterfeld
- 1968: Siegfried Bimberg, Kurt Böwe, Hermann Kant, Horst Schönemann, Ensemble des Arbeitertheaters am Klubhaus der Gewerkschaften
- 1969: Werner Heiduczek, Edgar Külow, Gerhard Schober, Hannes H. Wagner, Blasorchester des Standortmusikkorps des MdI Halle, Arbeitersinfonieorchester Klubhaus der Gewerkschaften Halle, Chor des VEB Chemische Werke Buna
- 1970: Blasorchester des Thomas-Müntzer-Schachtes Sangerhausen, Erwin Ernst, Waldtraut Lewin, Kollektiv "Monument 25 Jahre demokratische Bodenreform": Gerhard Berndt, Herbert Gebhardt, Max Kurzawa, Gerhard Lichtenfeld, Dieter Rex
- 1971: Horst Deichfuß, Rolf Kiy, Arbeiterjugendklub im Kulturhaus "Maxim Gorki" in Wittenberg, Opernensemble des Landestheaters Halle: Wolfgang Kersten, Thomas Sanderling, Wolfgang Nötzold
- 1972: Edith Brandt, Peter Schreier, Männerchor des Mansfeld-Kombinats
- 1973: Erik Neutsch, Olaf Koch, Bezirksmusikkorps "Fritz Weineck" der FDJ-Bezirksorganisation Halle, Hallenser Madrigalisten
- 1974: Helga Duty, Rosemarie und Werner Rataiczyk, Arbeiterjugend-Singeklub "Freundschaft", Dessau, Tanzpaar Peter Boehm and Sonja Dubina-Boehm
- 1975: Hans Jürgen Wenzel, Wolfgang Rumpf, Joachim Rähmer, Kollektiv Händelinterpreten des Landestheaters Halle: Christa Hilpisch, Jürgen Krassmann, Violetta Madjarowa, Hans-Jürgen Wachsmuth
- 1976: Theo Adam, Käthe Röschke, Gustav Schmahl, Hans-Georg Werner, Arbeiterjugendsingeclub der FDJ Leuna, Hallesche Philharmonie, with Robert-Franz-Singakademie and Stadtsingechor Halle, Kollektiv Händelinterpreten am Landestheater Halle: Werner Hasselmann, Barbara Hoene, Fred Teschler
- 1977: Gerd Domhardt, Erhard Geyer, Richard Stephan, Kollektiv des Händel-Hauses, Klubrat des Arbeiterjugendklubs am Theater "Junge Garde" and Zirkel bildnerisches Volksschaffen des VEB Chemiekombinat Bitterfeld
- 1978: Karl Meyer, Manfred Otte, Werner Süß, Dorfklub Molmerswende, FDJ-Chor Erweiterte Oberschule Schulpforta
- 1979: Hans-Jürgen Steinmann, Bernd Baselt, Hans Pflüger, Chor der Huttenschule Halle, Solistenkollektiv des Opernensembles am Landestheaters Halle: Elisabeth Hinze, Petra-Ines Strate, Jürgen Trekel
- 1980: Dietrich Sommer, Bernt Wilke, Karin Zauft, Kollektiv des Fernsehstudios Halle, Kinder- und Jugendballett der Filmfabrik Wolfen
- 1981: Hanna John, Christian Kluttig, Irmtraud Ohme, Ursula Sievers, Manfred Jendryschik, Stadtsingechor Halle
- 1982: Werner Peter, Jutta Peters, Heike Plaumann, Singeklub "Impuls" der Martin-Luther-Universität Halle-Wittenberg, Tanzorchester "Schwarz-Weiß" Halle
- 1983: Bernd Leistner, Karin Gittel, Otto Möhwald, Heinz Sachs, Chor des Walzwerkes Hettstedt im Mansfeld-Kombinat
- 1984: Walther Danz, Günther Kuhbach, Claus Nowak, Peter Rosen, Harzensemble am Klubhaus des VEB Eisen- und Hüttenwerke Halle
- 1985: Rüdiger Bernhardt, J. Merrill Knapp, Dietrich Knothe, Hermann Christian Polster, Wolfgang Unger, Hans-Günther Wauer, Chor des Energiekombinates/Wohnungsbaukombinats Halle, Gestalterkollektiv Händel-Haus und Inszenierungskollektiv "Floridante"
- 1986: Anneliese Probst, Wolfgang Hütt, Edwin Werner, Chor des Klubhauses des Chemie- und Industriepark Zeitz
- 1987: Else Kobe, Ronald Kobe, Dorothea Köhler, Johannes Künzel, Siegfried Voß, Chamber Choir Madrigal of the Mansfeld Kombinat and Eduard Melkus
- 1988: Thomas Müller, Uwe Pfeifer, Gerhard Neumann, Dietrich Schlegel, Sabine Bauer, Manfred Wippler
- 1989: Ludwig Güttler, Rolf Colditz, Horst Irrgang, Annette Markert, Manfred Rätzer, Tanzensemble des VEB Förderanlagen- u. Kranbau Köthen
- 1990: Terence Best, Helmut Brade, Thomas Reuter, Rudolf Stange, Hallesches Consort

After a two-year break:

- 1993: Nicholas McGegan
- 1994: Axel Köhler
- 1995: Winton Dean
- 1996: Howard Arman
- 1997: Emma Kirkby
- 1998: Helmut Gleim
- 1999: Trevor Pinnock
- 2000: Donald Burrows
- 2001: Sir John Eliot Gardiner
- 2002: Jean-Claude Malgoire
- 2003: Marc Minkowski
- 2004: Wolfgang Katschner
- 2005: Stanley Sadie
- 2006: Klaus Froboese
- 2007: Paul Goodwin
- 2008: Christopher Hogwood
- 2009: Jordi Savall
- 2010: Cecilia Bartoli
- 2011: Wolfgang Ruf
- 2012: Ragna Schirmer
- 2013/2014: Magdalena Kožená
- 2015: Philippe Jaroussky
- 2016: Romelia Lichtenstein
- 2017: Vivica Genaux
- 2018: Joyce DiDonato
- 2019: Silke Leopold
- 2020: Valer Barna-Sabadus
- 2021: Andrea Marcon
- 2022: Wolfgang Hirschmann
- 2023: Anna Bonitatibus
- 2024: Christophe Rousset
- 2025: Händelfestspielorchester Halle
- 2026: René Jacobs
