= Rodolphus =

Rodolphus is a Latin form of the name Rudolf. Notable people with this name include:

== Real people ==
- Rodolphus Agricola (1443–1485), humanist scholar
- Rodolphus Dickinson (1797–1849), US Representative
- R. Holland Duell (1824–1891), United States Representative from New York
- Rodolphus de Sancto Trudone (c. 1070–1138), Benedictine abbot

== Fictional characters ==
- Rodolphus Lestrange, Death Eater from the Harry Potter series
