= Wolfgang Ruf =

German musicologist and emeritus professor

Wolfgang Ruf (born 29 August 1941) is a German musicologist and emeritus professor.

== Life ==
Born in Radolfzell, Ruf studied musicology and history at the University of Freiburg, and obtained his doctorate in 1974. Until 1985 he was a research assistant of Hans Heinrich Eggebrecht at the Institute of Musicology in Freiburg. In 1984 he was habilitated and in 1985 received a professorship for musicology at the Johannes Gutenberg University Mainz. From 1994 to 2006, Ruf worked at the Martin Luther University of Halle-Wittenberg as well as at the Handel House in Halle. Ruf is editor and co-publisher of numerous publications.

He is married to Kathrin Eberl-Ruf, professor of musicology.

== Awards ==
- 2011: Handel Prize of the city of Halle (Saale).

== Publications ==
- Die Rezeption von Mozarts Le nozze di Figaro bei den Zeitgenossen in Archiv für Musikwissenschaft, Beihefte zum Archiv für Musikwissenschaft; vol. 16. Steiner, Wiesbaden 1977. Zugl.: Freiburg (Breisgau), Univ., Philos. Fak., Diss., 1974.
- Lexikon Musikinstrumente, editor Wolfgang Ruf, in collaboration with Christian Ahrens. Meyers Lexikonverlag, Mannheim 1991.
- Der Klang der Stadt : Musikkultur in Halle vom 17. bis zum 20. Jahrhundert. (Forschungen zur hallischen Stadtgeschichte; vol. 13.) Mitteldeutscher Verlag, Halle (Saale) 2009.

== Bibliography ==
- Wolfgang Hirschmann [editor): Aria. Eine Festschrift für Wolfgang Ruf. Olms, Hildesheim 2011, ISBN 978-3-487-14711-6.
