= Konrad Sasse =

German musicologist (1926–1981)

Konrad Sasse (3 October 1926 – 22 July 1981) was a German musicologist and Handel scholar.

== Life ==
Sasse was born in Wernigerode on October 3, 1926. After completing his Abitur in 1946 at the Fürst-Otto-Gymnasium in Wernigerode in the Harz, he studied musicology among others with Max Schneider and Walther Siegmund-Schultze at the Martin-Luther-University Halle-Wittenberg from 1948 to 1954, which he completed with the Staatsexamen and obtained his doctorate with a thesis on Robert Franz (1962). The work was revised and edited by Edwin Werner in 1986.

From 1954 to 1956, Sasse was secretary at the Handel Festival, Halle. From 1956 to 1981 he was director of the Handel House in Halle. At the same time he was in charge of the Bibliothek der Stiftung Händel-Haus.

In 1959, he became a member of the board of the Georg-Friedrich-Händel-Gesellschaft. From 1963 to 1968, he was head of the instrumentology working group within the Society for Music Research. From 1967 to 1971, he was president of the GDR country group of the International Association of Music Libraries, Archives and Documentation Centres. Until 1974, he was also a member of the presidium. He was also a guest lecturer for historical musicology at the Akademie für Staats- und Rechtswissenschaft der DDR. From 1971, he was also a lecturer for organology at the Humboldt University Berlin and the Martin Luther University Halle-Wittenberg.

He is the author of numerous relevant publications, including a Handel bibliography and studies on opera.

Sasse died on July 22, 1981 in Dessau at the age of 54.

== Awards ==
- Handel Prize of the Bezirk Halle (1960)
- Johannes-R.-Becher-Medaille in Silver (1962)

== Publications ==
- Das Händel-Haus in Halle. Geburtshaus Georg Friedrich Händels. Geschichte und Führer durch die Ausstellungen. Händel-Haus, Halle an der Saale 1958.
- Händel-Bibliographie. Deutscher Verlag für Musik VEB, Leipzig 1963.
- Beiträge zur Forschung über Leben und Werk von Robert Franz 1815–1892 (Schriften des Händelhauses in Halle. Vol. 4). Händel-Haus, Halle an der Saale 1986 – edited and published by Edwin Werner.
- 'Neue Daten zu Johann Christoph Schmidt', HJb 1957, 115–25
- ed.: ‘Opera Register from 1712 to 1734 (Colman-Register)’, HJb 1959, 199–223
- Katalog zu den Sammlungen des Händel-Hauses in Halle, 1–7 (Halle, 1961–80)
- Halle an der Saale: Musik (Halle, 1968)
