= Anneliese Probst =

German writer (1926–2011)

Anneliese Probst (married name in 2nd marriage Anneliese Seidler) (23 March 1926 – 10 October 2011) was a German writer.

== Life ==
Born in Düsseldorf, Probst had lived in Halle (Saale) since 1933. She attended a Gymnasium, where she passed the Abitur in 1944. In the same year, she married the lawyer Matthias Probst. Three children were born. From 1946, Anneliese Probst wrote literary works. In 1952/53 she worked as a dramaturge for the DEFA children's film studio. After the death of her first husband, she married the pastor Christof Seidler in 1971. She became a member of the CDU and was city councillor. In 1978 the couple moved to Beesenstedt (Saalkreis), where Seidler worked as a pastor until 1994. After the death of her second husband in 1997, Anneliese Probst lived in a retirement home in Holleben near Halle (Saale).

Probst was the author of children's books and youth books and also of novels for adults. From the 1960s, her works appeared mainly in the confessional publishing houses "Evangelische Verlagsanstalt" and "Union Verlag Berlin". Her works made 1.7 million copies.

Probst was a member of the Deutscher Schriftstellerverband. In 1990, she was one of the co-founders of the "Förderkreis der Schriftsteller in Sachsen-Anhalt". She drew the ideas for her books from her everyday experience, but also from overheard sentences or notes from the newspaper, and from confronting and dealing with problems in the course of her city council duties. She named her basic motive: "Let us not love with words, but with deeds and with truth".

In 1986, she was awarded the Handel Prize of the Halle District.

== Work ==
- Der unsterbliche Kaschtschej, Halle (Saale) 1947
- Der Zauberfisch, Halle (Saale) 1947
- Die steinerne Blume, Halle (Saale) 1948
- Das Zauberkorn. Der "singende Vogel". Die Wunderblume, Halle (S.) 1948
- Die Gazelle, Halle (S.) 1949
- Das Wunderpferdchen und andere russische Volksmärchen, Halle (Saale) 1950
- Schnurz, Berlin 1953 (together with Edith Müller-Beeck)
- Sagen und Märchen aus dem Harz, Berlin 1954
- Der steinerne Mühlmann, Berlin 1954 (with Kurt Bortfeldt)
- Schulgeschichten, Berlin 1955
- Sommertage, Berlin 1955
- Gespenstergeschichten, Berlin 1956
- Der steinerne Mühlmann, Berlin 1956
- Begegnung am Meer, Weimar 1957
- Ferien mit Susanne, Rodenkirchen/Köln 1957
- Sagen und Märchen aus Thüringen, Berlin 1957
- Die Geigerin, Berlin 1958
- Einsteigen bitte!, Berlin 1959
- Geschichten aus der 3a, Berlin 1960
- Ich … und Du, Berlin 1960
- Sabine und Martin, Berlin 1960
- Nein, diese Hanne!, Berlin 1961
- Wir brauchen euch beide, Berlin 1962
- Altweibersommer, Berlin 1964
- Die fröhliche Insel, Berlin 1964
- Menschen in der Heiligen Nacht, Berlin 1965
- Reifeprüfung, Berlin 1965
- Schatten, Berlin 1965
- Die verborgene Schuld, Berlin 1966
- Die letzten großen Ferien, Berlin 1967
- Die Pause, Berlin 1969
- Das Wiedersehen und andere Erzählungen über die Kunst, in Gelassenheit alt zu werden, Berlin 1970
- Menschen wie ich und du, Berlin 1971
- Die schöne Kuline, Berlin 1971
- Träumen mit der Feder, Berlin 1971
- Das Fräulein vom Hochhaus, Berlin 1972
- Ein Zeltschein für Dierhagen, Berlin 1972
- Die fünf aus Nr. 19, Berlin 1974
- Vergiß die kleinen Schritte nicht, Berlin 1974
- Die Christvesper oder Das Weihnachtsläuten von St. Martin, Berlin 1975
- Das weiße Porzellanpferd, Berlin 1976
- Die unentwegte Großmutter, Berlin 1978
- Karlchen oder Die Geschichte von der Eisernen Hochzeit, Berlin 1979
- Nenni kündigt nicht, Berlin 1980
- Die Legende vom Engel Ambrosio, Berlin 1981
- Unterwegs nach Gutwill, Berlin 1982
- Rund um den Taubenturm, Berlin 1984
- Stationen, Berlin 1984
- Hinkefüßchen, Niederwiesa 1986
- Orchesterprobe, Berlin 1986
- Lieber Gott, hörst du mich?, Constance 1987
- Annettes Stern, Berlin 1989
- Traumtänzerin, Berlin 1991
- Mein Wintertagebuch, Gößnitz 1995
- Anneliese Probst, Halle 1996
- Von Whisky, Wodka und anderen Lieblingen, Querfurt 1996
- Das lange Gespräch, Querfurt 1999
- Auf der Suche nach dem Kind, Leipzig 2000
- Steh-auf-Lieschen, Querfurt 2000
- Die steinerne Blume, Leipzig 2001
- Katzensommer, Querfurt 2003
- Tobias Kullerauge und andere Gute-Nacht-Geschichten, Halle 2005

== Awards ==
- Handel Prize
