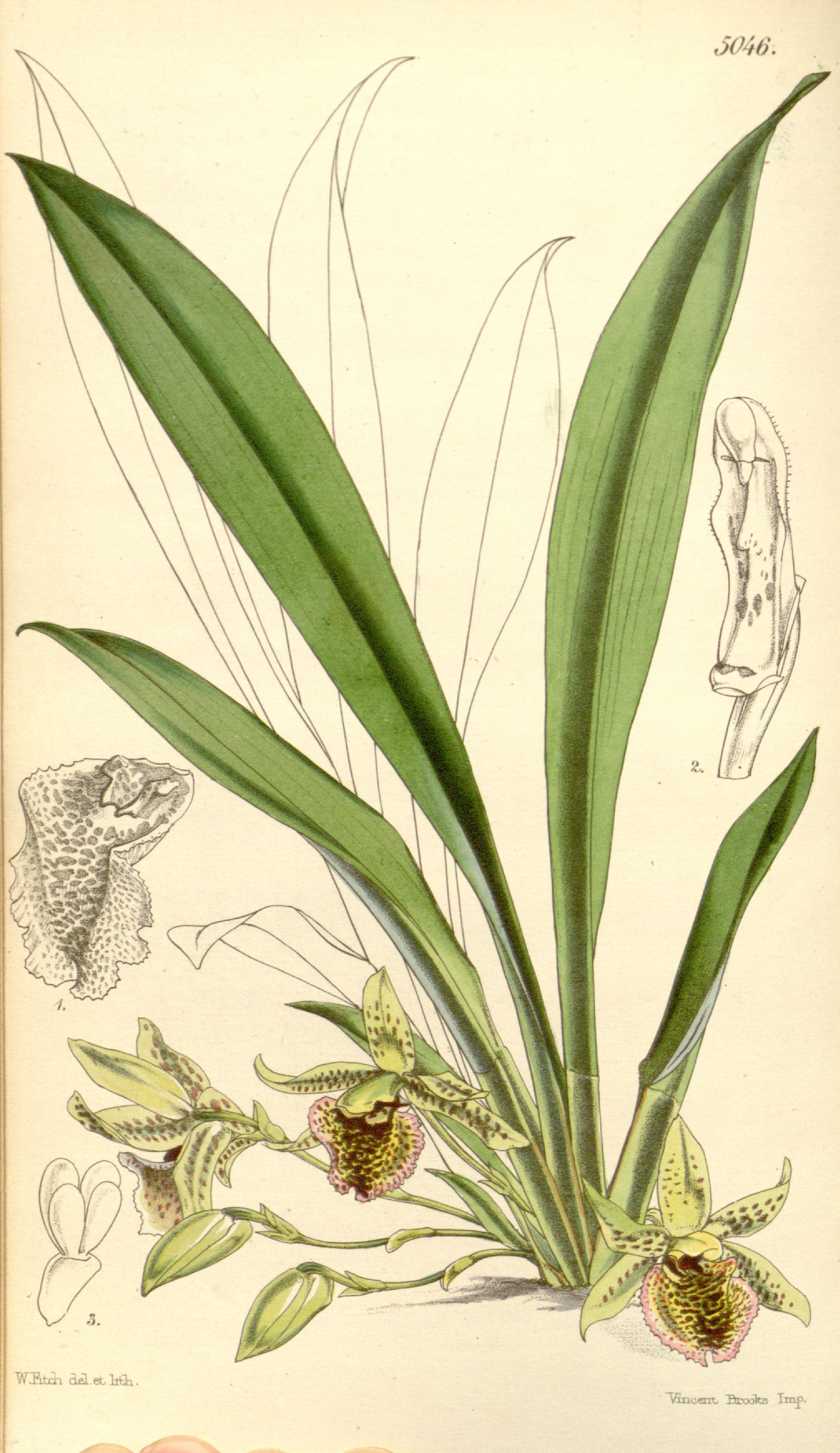
- Kefersteinia graminea 1858 illustration
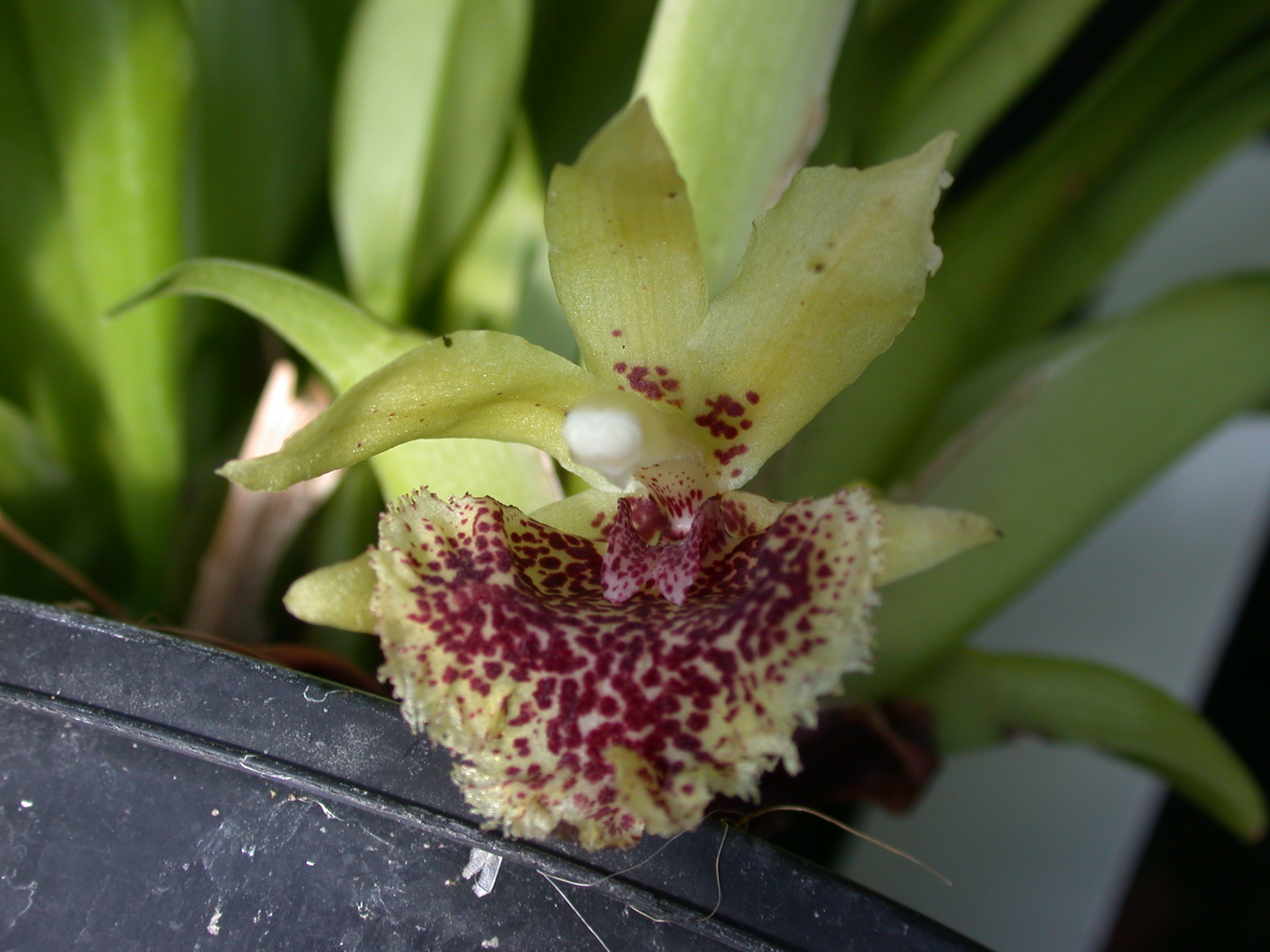

Scientific classification
- Kingdom: Plantae
- Clade: Tracheophytes
- Clade: Angiosperms
- Clade: Monocots
- Order: Asparagales
- Family: Orchidaceae
- Subfamily: Epidendroideae
- Genus: Kefersteinia
- Species: K. graminea

Binomial name
- Kefersteinia graminea Reichenbach f.

Synonyms
- Zygopetalum gramineum Lindley

= Kefersteinia graminea =

Species of orchid

Kefersteinia graminea is an orchid found in Venezuela, Colombia, and Ecuador. Euglossine bees pollinate the species.

== Description ==
Kefersteinia graminea grows just over 20 cm (7.9 in) tall. The plant's linear to lanceolate leaves are 18–36 cm (7.1–14.2 in) long. The one to three flowered inflorescence is up to 7.5 cm (3.0 in) long. The flowers are 5 cm (2.0 in) wide, with pale yellow-green sepals and petals and a white lip, all spotted with maroon. It flowers in the summer and fall.
