= Dieter Rex =

German painter and designer

Dieter Rex (2 January 1936, in Bad Frankenhausen – 20 November 2002) was a German painter and designer.

== Awards ==
- 1970: Handel Prize
- 1981: Art Prize of the German Democratic Republic.
