= Wolfgang Hütt =

German art historian (1925–2019)

Wolfgang Hütt (18 August 1925 – 14 January 2019) was a German art historian.

== Life and career ==
Born in Barmen, Hütt grew up in a working-class district of Barmen. He completed an apprenticeship as a bricklayer, then was drafted for military service. After the Second World War, he helped his parents work on a farm near Leipzig, where the family had been evacuated after a heavy Air Raids on Wuppertal. In 1948, the parents returned to their hometown.

At the same time, Hütt took up work as a journalist in Halle (Saale). He studied art history, German studies and architecture at the Martin Luther University of Halle-Wittenberg from 1946. From 1953 to 1957, he was an aspirant and lecturer at the Institute of Art History there and received his doctorate. From 1957 to 1959, Hütt took on a teaching position. During these years, he worked on his first work, Wir und die Kunst (We and Art), a popularly written introduction to the study of art and art history, which was published in 1959, and of which several greatly revised and expanded editions were published until 1988.

Numerous dogmatic objections from critics loyal to the line were directed against the publication. As early as 1956, the Ministry for State Security (MfS), Halle district administration, opened an "Operativer Vorgang" because of "softening up and decomposition activity within the University of Halle". Therefore, Hütt followed the call of the rector, Professor Johannes Jahn, to the Institute for Art History at the University of Leipzig and continued his academic work there as a senior assistant from 1959 to 1961. But even in Leipzig, the observation by the MfS, Leipzig district administration, continued and culminated in the suspicion of organising an "anti-state group formation".

Because of his art-theoretical views - which the leadership of the German Democratic Republic (GDR) as "revisionist" - he was increasingly defamed by the Socialist Unity Party of Germany (SED). After his public criticism of the construction of the Berlin Wall and his opposition to initial plans in the context of urban redevelopment to sacrifice the Paulinerkirche, he was expelled from the SED in 1961 and dismissed from Leipzig University.

Nevertheless, Hütt did not leave the GDR, but continued to work as a freelance publicist in Halle. An attempt to gain a foothold as director of the "Staatliche Galerie Moritzburg Halle" (1969-1971) failed. After his commitment to formalism" and his opposition to the sale of works of art from the gallery's depot, Hütt had to give up this position in 1971. Subsequently, he produced an extensive journalistic oeuvre. Precisely because of his conflicts with the dogmatists in the GDR, Hütt contributed to an objective view of the art history of the GDR.

As a member of the advisory board of the art publishers of the GDR, as a member of the advisory board of the Zeitschrift "Bildende Kunst" and the artists' associations, Hütt was valued as a contentious discussion partner.

Hütt never accepted the prescribed separation from his family and his hometown of Wuppertal, and despite all the sanctions he never let contact break off. He dealt with this life conflict in Heimfahrt in die Gegenwart (1925 to 1949), published in 1982, and the autobiography Schattenlicht - ein Leben im geteilten Deutschland, published in 1999.

After the Peaceful Revolution, Hütt conducted extensive research for years in the bequeathed archives of the SED, the Stasi and in the Landesarchiv Sachsen-Anhalt. On this basis, he created the extensive book Gefördert. Monitored. Reform Pressure of Visual Artists in the GDR - The Example of Halle.

Hütt continued to support young academics into old age. After a serious illness, he had to end his publishing work in 2015 and handed over extensive material to the Academy of Arts as an estate. He died in January 2019 at the age of 93 in a nursing home in Halle-Kröllwitz.

== Awards ==
In 1986 he was awarded the Handel Prize of the Halle district.

== Publications as author (selection) ==
- Wir und die Kunst. Henschelverlag Berlin, 1959 (grundlegend überarbeitete Neuauflagen 1973 und 1988)
- Adolph Menzel. E. A. Seemann, Leipzig, 1964 (3rd edition), 2008 (Lizenz in München und Wien)
- Deutsche Malerei und Graphik im 20. Jahrhundert. Henschelverlag Berlin, 1968
- Mathis Gothard Neithardt, genannt Grünewald. Leben und Werk im Spiegel der Forschung, E. A. Seemann, Leipzig, 1968
- Was Bilder erzählen. Kinderbuchverlag Berlin, 1969
- Deutsche Malerei und Graphik der frühbürgerlichen Revolution. Leipzig, 1973
- Kleine bunte Welt. Kinderbuchverlag Berlin, 1973 (auch engl., span., ungar. Ausgaben)
- Wir – Unsere Zeit – Künstler der DDR in ihren Selbstbildnissen. Henschelverlag Berlin, 1974
- Arbeit in der Kunst. E. A. Seemann Leipzig, 1974
- Plastik, Grafik, Malerei. (Mein kleines Lexikon) Kinderbuchverlag Berlin, 1974
- Willi Sitte. Verlag der Kunst, Dresden, 1976
- Was Städte und Häuser erzählen. Kinderbuchverlag Berlin, 1977
- Künstler in Halle. Henschelverlag, Berlin, 1977
- Carl Marx. Verlag der Kunst, Dresden, 1978
- Grafik in der DDR. Verlag der Kunst, Dresden, 1979.
- Holbein d.J., Maler und Werk. Verlag der Kunst, 1980
- Carl Crodel. Verlag der Kunst, Dresden, 1981
- Heimfahrt in die Gegenwart – Ein Bericht. Henschelverlag, Berlin, 1982
- Adolph Menzel – Ausgewählte Holzschnitte. E. A. Seemann, Leipzig, 1983
- Die Düsseldorfer Malerschule. E. A. Seemann Leipzig, 1984
- Der Drachentöter im Paradiesgärtlein – Ikonografie für Kinder. Kinderbuchverlag, Berlin, 1988
- Deutsche Malerei und Grafik 1750–1945. Henschelverlag Berlin, 1986
- Defregger 1835–1921. Leipzig und München, 1986
- Hintergrund – Mit den Unzüchtigkeits- und Gotteslästerungsparagraphen gegen Kunst und Künstler, 1900–1933., Henschelverlag, 1990
- Schattenlicht. Fliegenkopf-Verlag, Halle, 1999.
- Gefördert. Überwacht. Reformdruck bildender Künstler der DDR. Das Beispiel Halle. Stekovics, 2004, ISBN 3-89923-073-6.
- Zinnoberrot und Schweinfurter Grün. Roman, Halle (Saale), 2009
- Wo ist Arkadien? Roman, Halle (Saale), 2011

== Publications as co-author (selection) ==
- Der Naumburger Dom. Sachsenverlag Dresden, 1956
- Otto Nagel, Berliner Bilder. 1970
- Albrecht Dürer, Das Gesamte graphische Werk. Henschelverlag, Berlin 1971 (Lizenzausgabe Verlag Rogner & Bernhard, München)
- Das Albrecht Dürer Hausbuch. Rogner & Bernhard, Munich, 1975
- Ludwig Knaus. Wiesbaden, 1979
- Figurative Malerei aus dem letzten Jahrzehnt der DDR. 1999
- Enge und Vielfalt – Auftragskunst und Kunstförderung in der DDR. 1999
- Ergötzliche Briefe des Dessauer Malers Carl Marx an Wolfgang Hütt. 2002
- Johann Peter Hasenclever – Ein Malerleben zwischen Biedermeier und Revolution. Solingen, 2003
- Further more than 400 scientific and popular science publications, essays and contributions.
