= Wolfgang Hirschmann =

German musicologist

Wolfgang Hirschmann (born 1960) is a German musicologist.

Born in Fürth, from 1979 to 1985 Hirschmann studied musicology, history of German literature and theatre at the University of Erlangen–Nuremberg where he received his doctorate in 1985 with the thesis Studien zum Konzertschaffen von Georg Philipp Telemann. He then worked as research assistant in Erlangen and received a scholarship from the Deutsche Forschungsgemeinschaft until he was habilitated in Erlangen in 1999. The title of his habilitation thesis was Auctoritas und Imitatio. Studien zur Rezeption von Guidos Micrologus in der Musiktheorie des Hoch- und Spätmittelalters.

Initially as a private lecturer, from 2002 as Academic senate, he taught in Erlangen, where he received a professorship at the Musicological Institute in 2005. In March 2007 he was appointed to the Chair of Historical Musicology at the Martin-Luther-University Halle-Wittenberg in succession to Wolfgang Ruf. Since 2009 he has been president of the Georg-Friedrich-Händel-Gesellschaft, an international association which, among other things, has been associated with the Hallische Händel-Ausgabe a critical edition of the works of the composer George Frideric Handel (1685–1759). In 2022, he received the Handel Prize.

== Publications ==
- Hirschmann, Wolfgang (1986). Studien zum Konzertschaffen von Georg Philipp Telemann (in German). Kassel: Bärenreiter. ISBN 3-7618-0787-2. OCLC 15789833.

As publisher:

- Hirschmann, Wolfgang; Jahn, Bernhard (2010). Johann Mattheson als Vermittler und Initiator Wissenstransfer und die Etablierung neuer Diskurse in der ersten Hälfte des 18. Jahrhunderts (in German). Hildesheim. ISBN 978-3-487-14453-5. OCLC 699865497.
- Hirschmann, Wolfgang (2011). Händels "Messiah" zum Verhältnis von Aufklärung, Religion und Wissen im 18. Jahrhundert (in German). Halle (Saale). ISBN 978-3-89812-848-3. OCLC 772614401.
- Hirschmann, Wolfgang; Wollny, Peter; Mitteldeutsche Barockmusik in Sachsen, Sachsen-Anhalt und Thüringen e.V. (2012). Wilhelm Friedemann Bach und die protestantische Kirchenkantate nach 1750 (in German). Beeskow. ISBN 978-3-937788-28-9. OCLC 824727294.
- Mattheson, Johann; Hirschmann, Wolfgang; Jahn, Bernhard; Drauschke, Hansjörg; Mackensen, Karsten; Neubacher, Jürgen; Stoltz, Dominik (2014). Texte aus dem Nachlass (in German). Hildesheim: Olms. ISBN 978-3-487-14531-0. OCLC 930759631.
