= Pädagogische Hochschule Halle-Köthen =

German Hochschule

The Pädagogische Hochschule Halle-Köthen (Halle school of education) was institution in Bezirk Halle, Germany, and since 1990 also in Saxony-Anhalt, which served primarily to train teachers for higher education. It emerged in 1988 from the unification of the schools of education in Halle (Saale) and Köthen, and was incorporated into the Martin Luther University of Halle-Wittenberg in 1993.

== Institut für Lehrerbildung "N.K. Krupskaya" Halle ==
Already in the Weimar Republic there was a Pädagogische Akademie Halle from 1930 to 1933/34. The GDR established the Institut für Lehrerbildung from 1950, including in Halle. In 1952, the building of the Institut was erected in Hoher Weg in Halle-Kröllwitz, a spacious palace-like building, which was kept in a plain color with consideration for the surroundings, but was decorated in the style of the time of construction with works by various artists from the district.

In 1969, the Pädagogische Akademie was named after the Russian pedagogue and revolutionary Nadezhda Konstantinovna Krupskaya, and in 1972 it was elevated to the "N.K. Krupskaya" Pedagogical College.

The college was divided into the following faculties:

- Biology/Chemistry
- Mathematics/Physics
- polytechnics (from the end of the 80s polytechnics/computer science)
- Marxism-Leninism (served the compulsory training of university students in this subject in the GDR).
- Pedagogy/Psychology/Friendship Pioneer Leader Training

A branch in Dessau operated a preliminary course that provided university entrance qualifications for 10th grade graduates within one year.

== College of education "Wolfgang Ratke" Köthen ==
In 1885, construction began on the present Ratke building in Lohmannstraße in Köthen. In 1887, it was inaugurated as the Herzoglich Anhaltisches Landesseminar zu Cöthen. It housed the Deutsche Oberschule from 1920 to 1936. In 1950, a school of education was established there, which was elevated to the status of an Institut für Lehrerbildung in 1963 and to the status of a College of Education Wolfgang Ratke in 1974.

== University of Education Halle-Köthen ==
In 1988, the University of Education "Wolfgang Ratke" Köthen was merged with the University of Education "N.K. Krupskaja" Halle to form the University of Education "N.K. Krupskaja" Halle-Köthen. The rector until then was Robert Künstner, who had already headed the PH Halle since 1985. The mathematician Werner Jungk was honoured as Verdienter Hochschullehrer der Deutschen Demokratischen Republik.

In 1991, the institution shed the honorary name it had been given in 1969 and since then has only been called Pädagogische Hochschule Halle-Köthen. In the same year, the university hosted the International Progressive education Conference.

The Institute for School Pedagogy and Primary School Didactics of the "Wolfgang Ratke" University of Education, then the Halle-Köthen University of Education, which existed from 1970 to 1992, has been an institute of the Martin Luther University of Halle-Wittenberg since 1993. Since the winter semester of 1997, the seat of the institute has been in the Francke Foundations, as well as the whole college was affiliated to the Martin Luther University in 1993.

The Ratke building in Köthen was transferred to the Anhalt University of Applied Sciences in 1997 and was used by the Studienkolleg and the European Distance Learning Centre in the Saxony-Anhalt University Network (EFZSA). Since 2000, it has been used by the Department of Computer Science and Languages.

== Studies and academic life ==
The duration of studies at pedagogical institutes was extended from two to three years in 1955 and to four years in 1958/59. The content and ideology of the studies were adapted to the requirements of the Polytechnic Secondary School, which was newly created in 1959. Since 1982, the training period was extended by an additional year, which served the large school internship (comparable to a Referendariat). The study was usually completed with the academic degree of Diplomlehrers and the teaching license for two subjects. Thus, following the section structure, mainly diploma teachers for mathematics and physics as well as for biology and chemistry were trained. Diploma teachers for polytechnics (industrial arts, Einführung in die sozialistische Produktion and technical drawing) and Freundschaftspionierleiter were used in the other sections.

As higher academic degrees, the Dr. paed. and the Dr. rer. nat could be earned, and the Doctorate B to Dr. sc. was also possible.

The college not only trained high school teachers, but its scientists also conducted research in the pedagogical field as well as in the sciences taught as a school or study subject. They published their results both in the scientific journal published by the college itself and in international journals and monographs. Furthermore, scientists from the college also guided high school students who were successful in the national chemistry Olympiads and prepared for the International Chemistry Olympiad.
