= Gerhard Lichtenfeld =

German sculptor

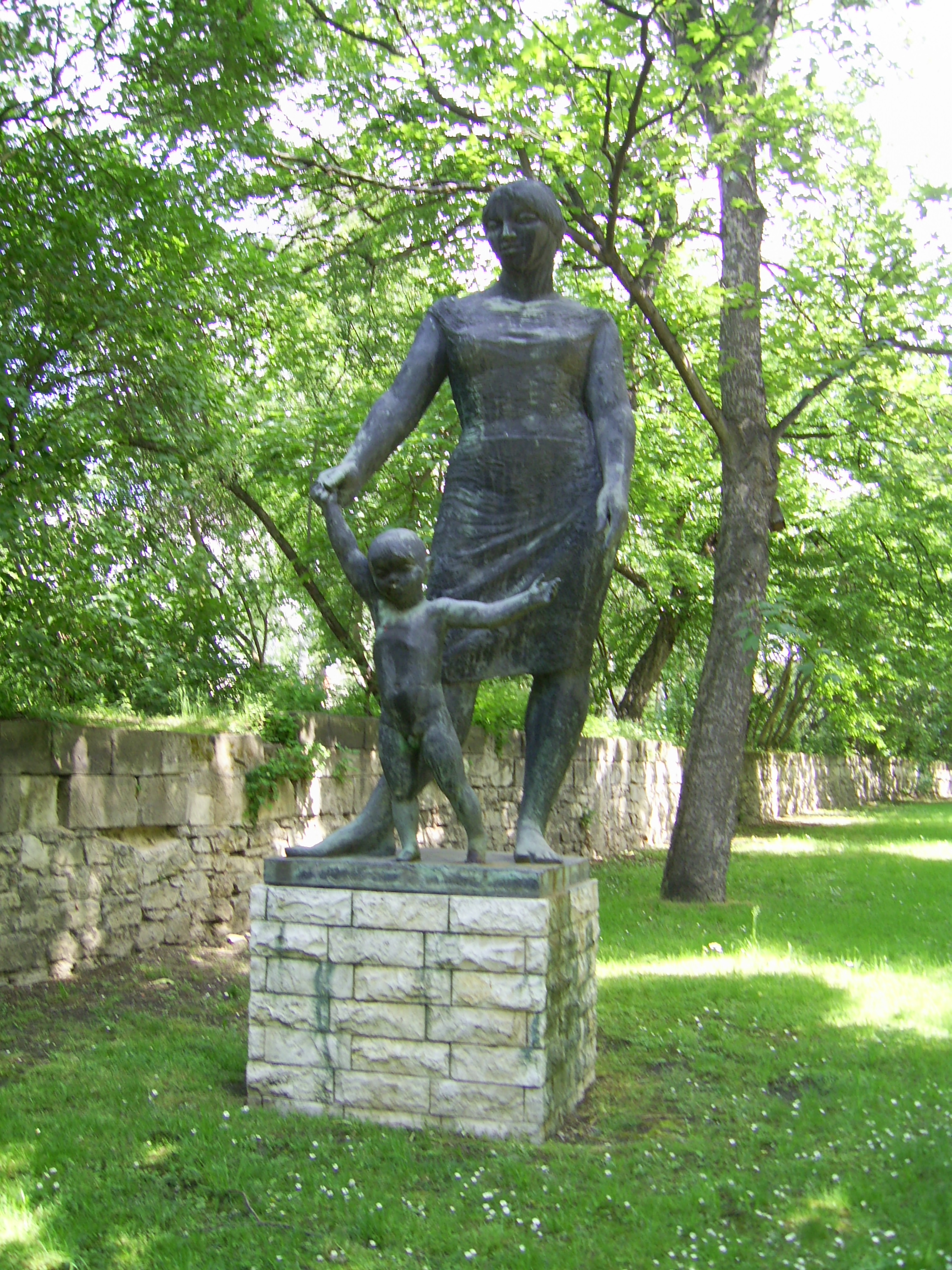
- Mutter und Kind by Lichtenfeld in Naumburg
- Born: 6 November 1921; Halle (Saale), Germany
- Died: 6 November 1978 (aged 57); Halle, East Germany
- Education: University of Halle; Burg Giebichenstein
- Known for: Bronze sculpture
- Awards: Handel Prize; National Prize of the German Democratic Republic

Gerhard Lichtenfeld (6 November 1921 – 6 November 1978) was a German sculptor and academic teacher, whose works were installed in public space in the Halle (Saale) and Merseburg districts, and who exhibited internationally. He was awarded the Handel Prize.

== Life ==
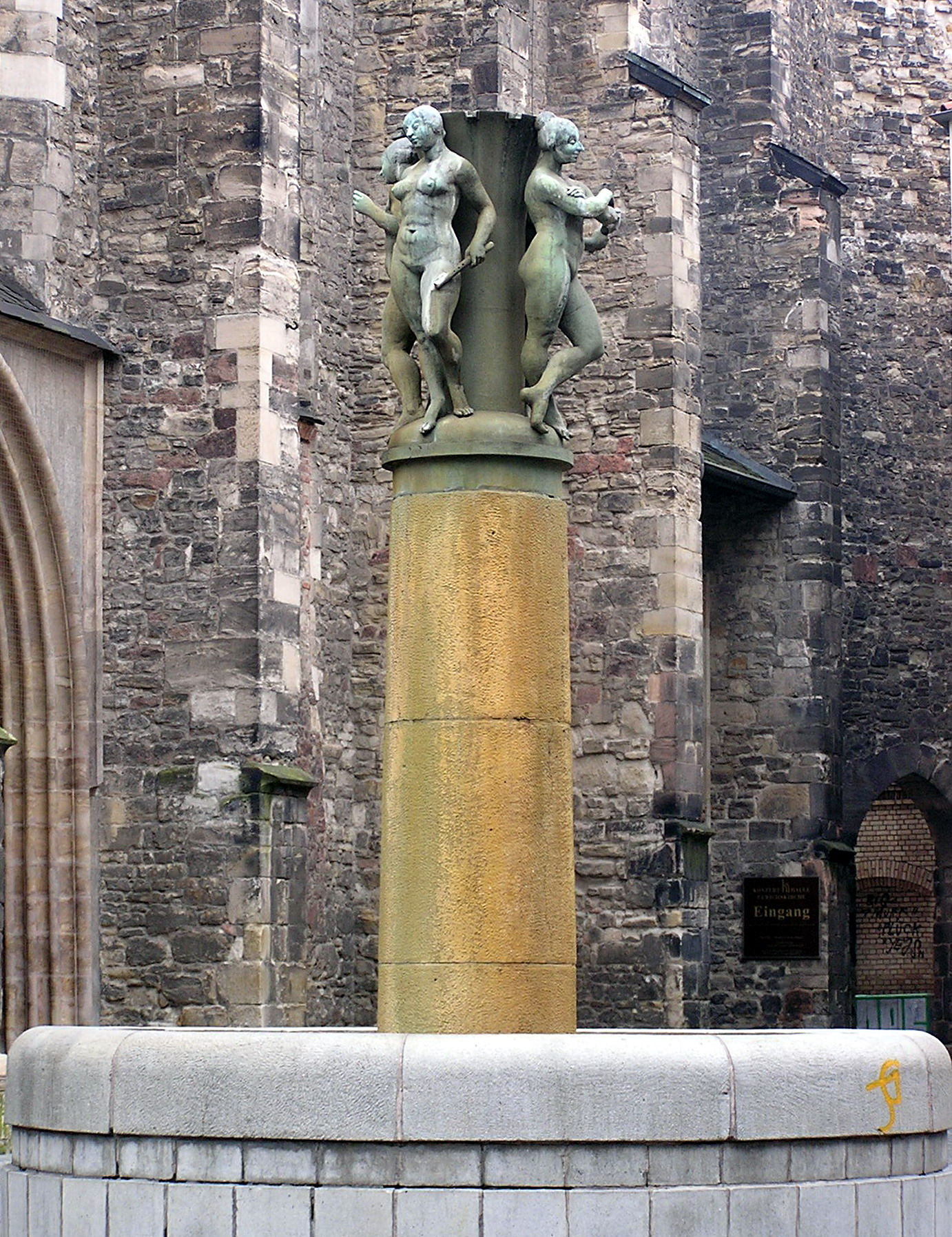
Musenbrunnen in Halle

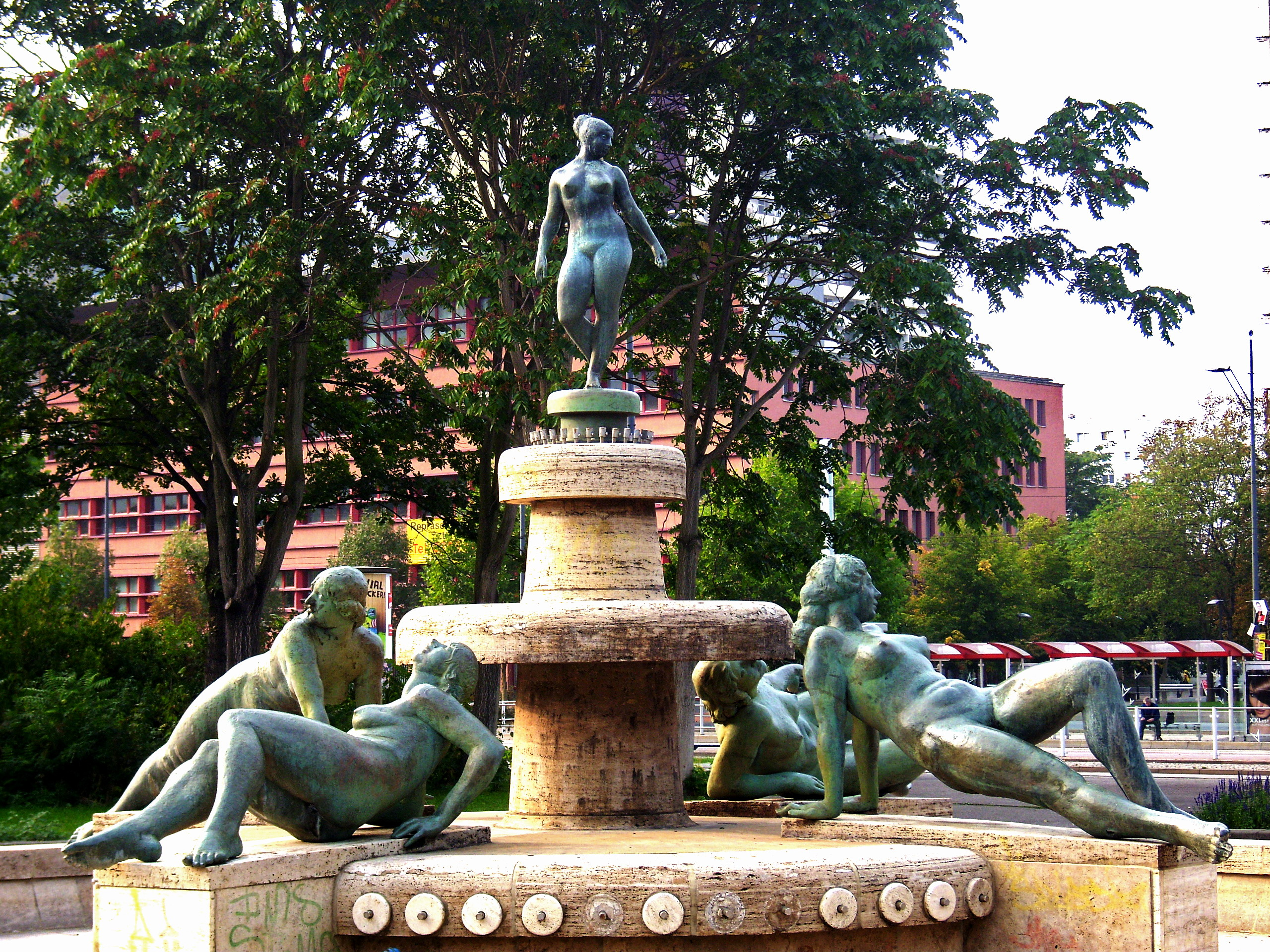
Frauenbrunnen in Halle

Lichtenfeld was born in Halle (Saale). During service in the Reichsarbeitsdienst, he had an accident in 1940 and lost his left underarm. He studied law, as his father wished, at the University of Halle from 1942 to 1945. After World War II, he worked as a construction labourer.

He applied for the sculptors' class of Gustav Weidanz at Burg Giebichenstein, was accepted and studied Künstlerische Werkgestaltung, graduating with a diploma for sculpture in 1952. He then worked as assistant of Weidanz. From 1959, he directed the sculptors' class at the institute, now called Hochschule für industrielle Formgestaltung Halle – Burg Giebichenstein (now: Burg Giebichenstein University of Art and Design). He was a lecturer there from 1964, and professor in 1966.

He designed the layout of the central cemetery in Merseburg, and was a consultant for the Merseburg and Halle districts for municipipal design. Several of his works were installed in public space. He took part in international exhibitions.

Lichtenberg died in Halle on his 57th birthday. A street in Halle is named after him.

== Awards ==
Lichtenfeld was awarded the Handel Prize of the Halle Bezirk in 1963 and 1970, the Kunstpreis (Art prize) of the town in 1971, and the National Prize of the German Democratic Republic in 1974.
