= Händel-Jahrbuch =

Academic journal

The Händel-Jahrbuch (HJb) is a music scientific journal dedicated to the composer George Frideric Handel. It is published annually by the international Handel-Gesellschaft in conjunction with the foundation Handel House in Halle. The "scientific secretary" of the Handel Society is also chief editor of the Jahrbuch, and since 2011 the musicologist Annette Landgraf.

== Publisher ==
The Jahrbuch was first published by the musicologist Rudolf Steglich from Hannover for the new Handel-Gesellschaft in Leipzig, founded in 1925 by Hermann Abert. From 1928 to 1933, it was published in six volumes by Breitkopf & Härtel in Leipzig.

From 1955, the Handel-Gesellschaft published it as a new series at the Deutscher Verlag für Musik in Leipzig. The first four volumes can be counted twice as a continuation of the old series. Between 1992 and 1995, Studio-Verlag in Cologne managed the publication.

Since then, the Jahrbuch has been published by Bärenreiter-Verlag in Kassel. In 2008, the Handel House Foundation in Halle became a partner.

== Content ==
Contributions to the Händel-Jahrbuch are published mainly in German, with some contributions in English. Although between 1967 and 1976 the Jahrbuch sporadically described international academic conferences held at the Handel Festival in Halle, since 1989 have been regularly published. In addition, public lectures for the Festival are printed along with free research contributions. The economist Manfred Rätzer continues to provide statistical records of the current performances of Handel's operas and oratorios in the yearbook. The volumes also include the business accounts of the president of the association. Various forthcoming publications on Handel are advertised, including new volumes of the Hallische Händel-Ausgabe (HHA, a critical complete edition).

== Access ==
The contributions to the Handel Yearbook are listed in the online catalogue (OPAC) of the Library of the Handel House Foundation in Halle. The Jahrbuch is available for purchase in bookshops, free to members of the association.

== Editorial office ==
For more than three decades (1955 to 1988) the Handel researcher Walther Siegmund-Schultze held the position of Scientific Secretary of the Society.
