= Dietrich Knothe =

German conductor (1929–2000)

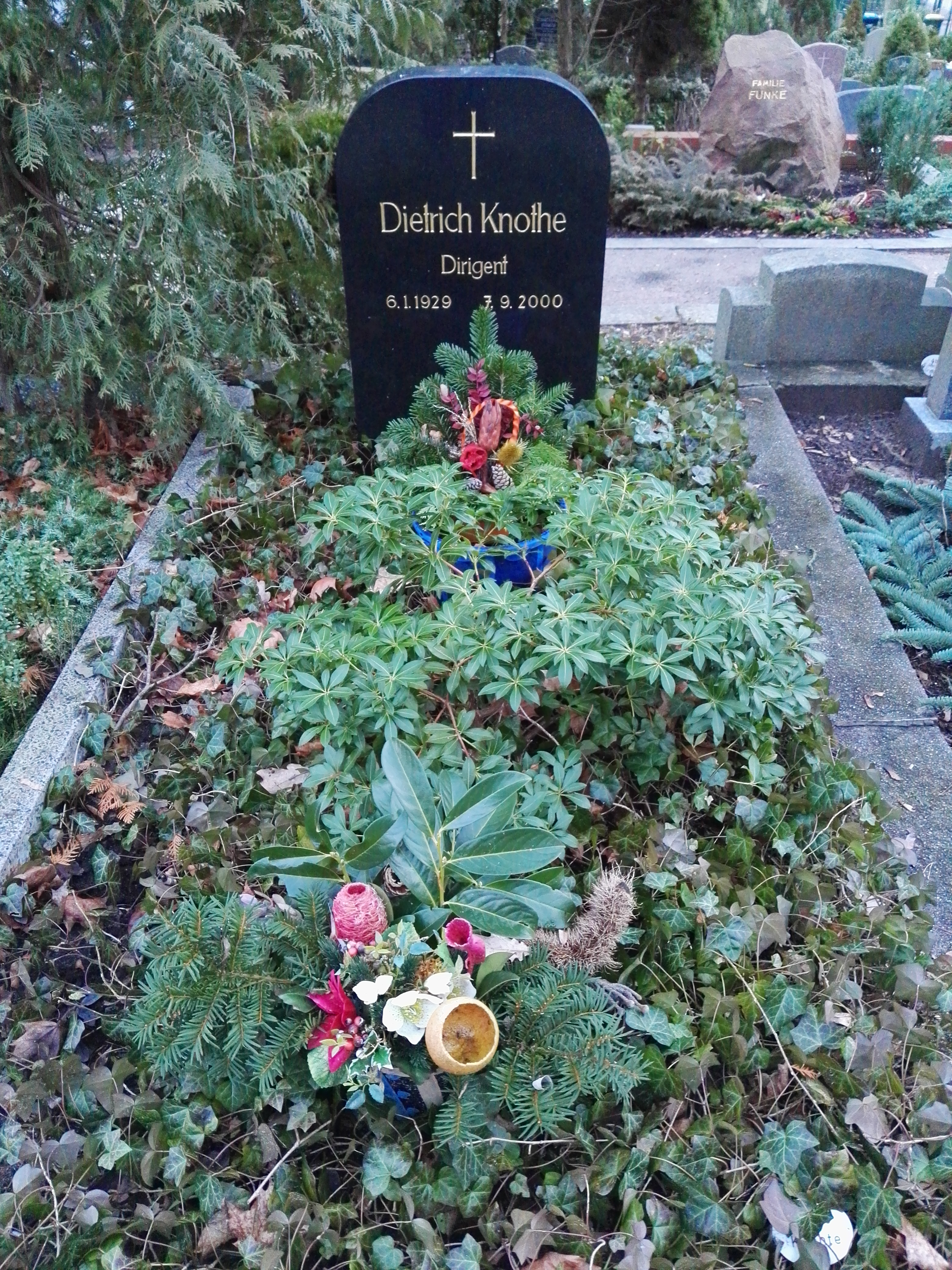
Knothe's tombstone

Dietrich Knothe (6 January 1929 – 7 September 2000) was a German conductor and choral conductor. He is the winner of the 1985 Handel Prize presented by the city of Halle.

== Biography ==
Knothe was born in Dresden. At the age of 10, he joined the Thomanerchor of the St. Thomas School, Leipzig under conductor Günther Ramin in 1939. After his studies at the music academies of Leipzig and Berlin-Charlottenburg, Knothe worked from 1953 with the MDR Rundfunkchor of Leipzig.

In 1955, he founded the "Capella Lipsiensis", an ensemble of soloists with whom he mainly performed music of the Renaissance and the Baroque eras.

For political reasons Knothe was dismissed without notice in 1962 when he and his choir gave up singing the National Anthem after a concert. Until he was appointed vice-director of the Berliner Singakademie in 1966, Knothe was a taxi driver and pianist in a ballet school. In 1975, he was promoted to director of the Berlin Singakademie. In 1979, he was awarded the Art Prize of the German Democratic Republic.

From 1982 to 1993, Knothe was music conductor of the Rundfunkchor Berlin.

He died in Berlin, on 7 September 2000, aged 71.
