= Hans-Günther Wauer =

Hans-Günther Wauer (12 December 1925 – 17 February 2016) was a German church musician, winner of the 1985 Handel Prize.
