= Wilhelm Friedemann Bach House =

Museum in Halle (Saale), Germany

- Wilhelm-Friedemann-Bach-Haus
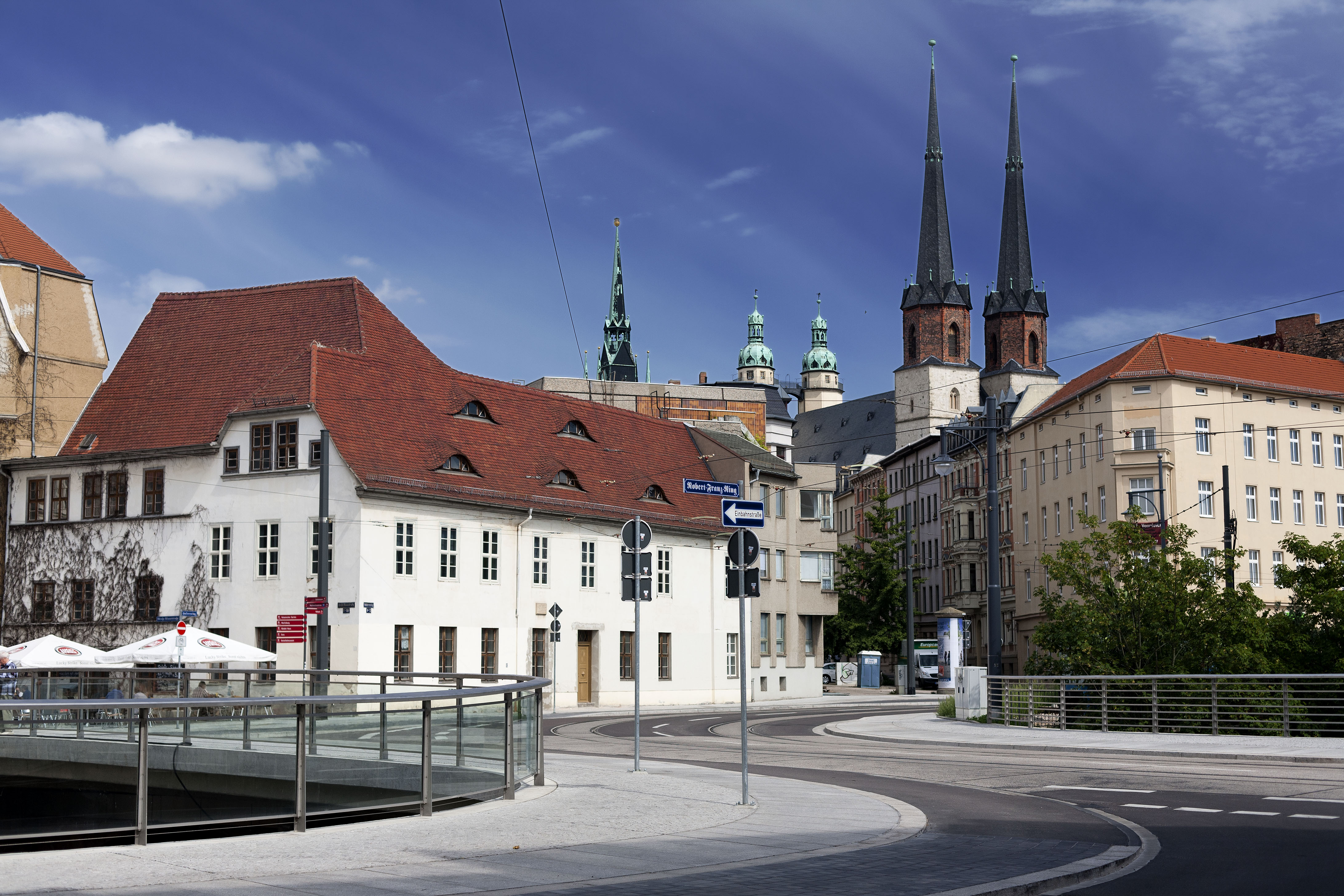
- The museum is on the left; towers of the Market Church are in the background
- Interactive map of the Wilhelm Friedemann Bach House area

General information
- Location: Große Klausstraße 12; 06108 Halle (Saale), Germany
- Coordinates: 51°28′59″N 11°57′54″E

Website
- haendelhaus.de/ausstellungen/wilhelm-friedemann-bach-haus-halle

The Wilhelm Friedemann Bach House is a cultural site in Halle in Saxony-Anhalt, Germany. The composer Wilhelm Friedemann Bach (1710–1784), eldest son of Johann Sebastian Bach, lived here during part of his career; the building now has an exhibition about W. F. Bach and other composers who lived in Halle.

== History ==
From 1746 to 1770, Wilhelm Friedemann Bach lived in Halle, where he was organist at Marktkirche Unser Lieben Frauen; from 1763 or earlier, he lived in this house.

The house was opened to the public in 2012, after renovation work. In a new part of the building is the exhibition Musikstadt Halle. In the part preserved in its original state is a 16th-century Bohlenstube (an insulated, heated room), and musical instruments from the 16th century.

== Exhibition ==
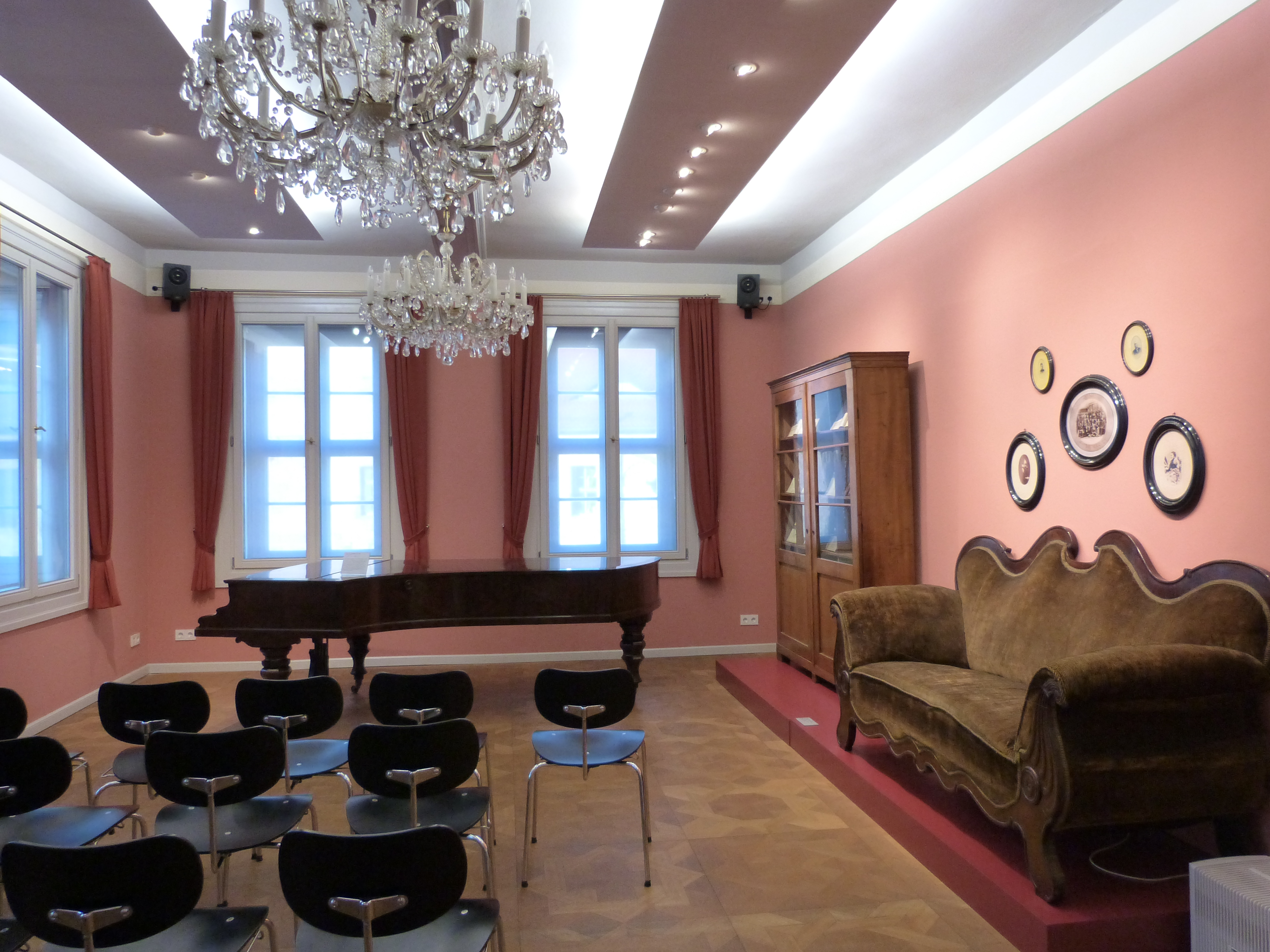
The Robert Franz salon, in Wilhelm Friedemann Bach House: Franz's grand piano, and furniture from his estate.

There is a permanent exhibition, Musikstadt Halle, about the lives and works of composers associated with Halle: Samuel Scheidt (1587–1654), George Frideric Handel, Wilhelm Friedemann Bach, Johann Friedrich Reichardt (1752–1814), Carl Loewe (1796–1869) and Robert Franz (1815–1892); and about Hausmusik (home concerts) in Halle. The exhibition is operated by Stiftung Händel-Haus (the Handel House Foundation, established for Handel's birthplace in Halle).

== See also ==
- List of music museums
