= Rudolf Steglich =

German musicologist and lecturer

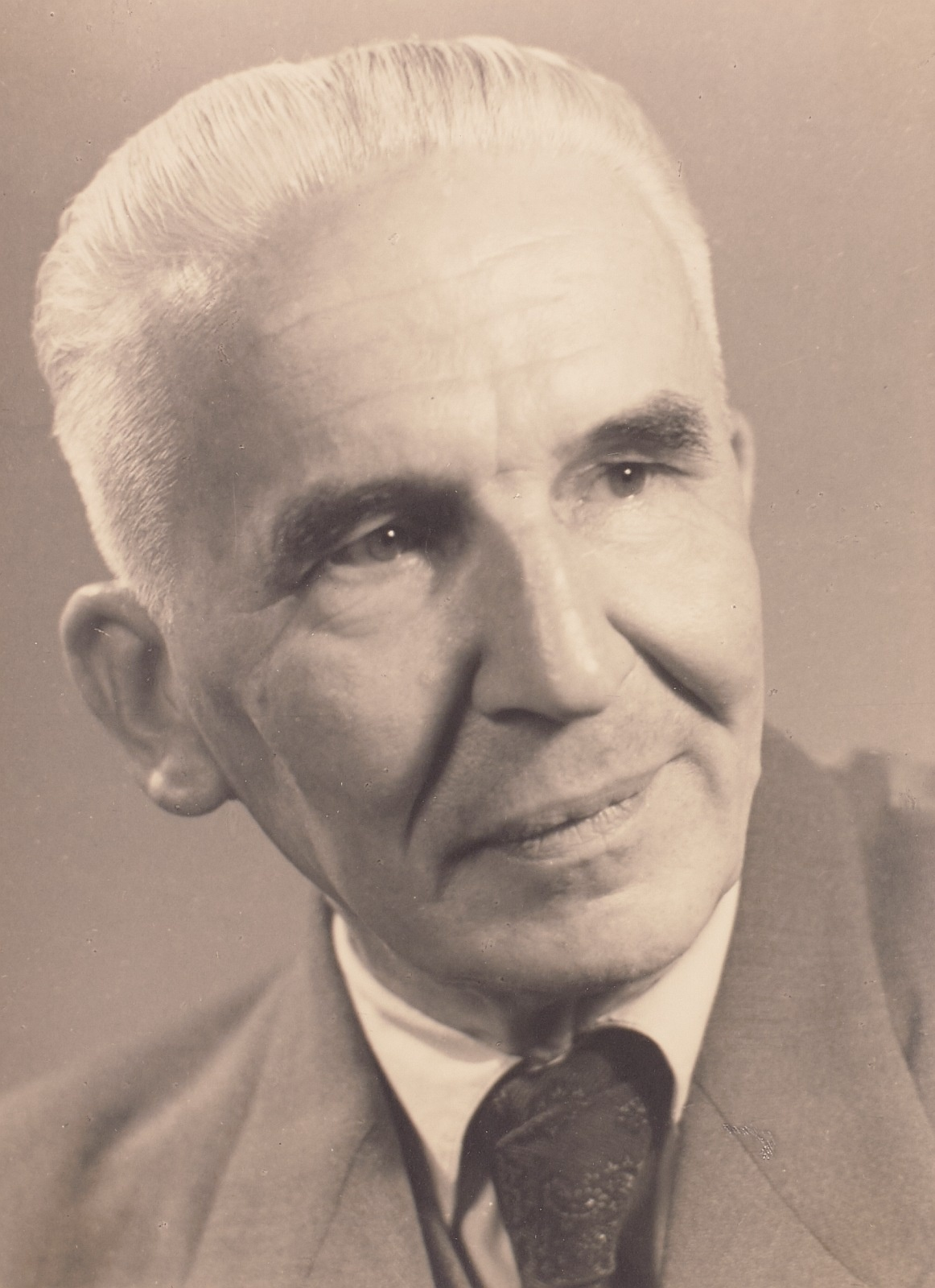
- Steglich in 1955
- Born: 18 February 1886; Rats-Damnitz, Province of Pomerania, Prussia
- Died: 8 July 1976 (aged 90); Scheinfeld, Bavaria, Germany
- Education: Ludwig-Maximilians-Universität München; Humboldt University of Berlin; University of Leipzig
- Occupations: Musicologist; Music editor; Music publisher
- Organizations: University of Erlangen; Georg-Friedrich-Händel-Gesellschaft
- Known for: Hallische Händel-Ausgabe

Rudolf Steglich (18 February 1886 – 8 July 1976) was a German musicologist, music editor and academic teacher, who was professor at the University of Erlangen from 1930 to 1956. His focus was life and music of George Frideric Handel. He was instrumental in the composer's revival from the 1920s, and was from 1955 co-editor of the Hallische Händel-Ausgabe, the critical edition of the composer's complete works.

== Career ==
Steglich was born in Rats-Damnitz, then in the Prussian Province of Pomerania, now in Poland. He studied in Dresden from 1900 to 1906 with Liszt pupil Bertrand Roth. He then studied musicology with Adolf Sandberger at the Ludwig-Maximilians-Universität München and with Johannes Wolf at the Humboldt University of Berlin. In 1911, he achieved the doctorate, supervised by Hugo Riemann, at the University of Leipzig with a dissertation Die quaestiones in musica: ein Choraltraktat des zentralen Mittelalters und ihr mutmasslicher Verfasser Rudolf von St. Trond (1070-1138) (The quaestiones in musica: A Choral Tract of the Central Middle Ages and its presumed author Rudolf of St Trond (1070-1138)).

Steglich served as a soldier in the First World War. From 1919 to 1929, he was music journalist for the Hannoverscher Anzeiger. He taught at the Hannover Conservatory from 1925.

Steglich achieved his habilitation in 1930 at the University of Erlangen with a thesis Die elementare Dynamik des musikalischen Rhythmus (The elementary dynamics of musical rhythm). He then succeeded Gustav Becking as Privatdozent for musicology, and was also chairman of the musicology seminar. In 1934, he became associate professor. At the same time, he was from 1935 a lecturer at the Nürnberg Conservatory and at the Freie Hochschule für Handel, Industrie und allgemeine Volksbildung. From 1936 to 1940, he published the journal Archiv für Musikforschung. He was one of 26 musicologists who took part in the 1938 Reichsmusiktage in Düsseldorf, an event of Nazi propaganda. After World War II, Steglich taught in Erlangen until his retirement in 1956.

Steglich died in Scheinfeld near Nürnberg at the age of 90.

== Focus on Handel, legacy ==
While Steglich researched music of the 18th and early 19th century (Bach and his sons, Handel, Mozart, Beethoven and Schumann), the focus of his interest was George Frideric Handel. In the 1920s, he contributed to the Handel renaissance. From 1928 to 1933, he was editor of the Händel-Jahrbuch (Handel yearbook). In 1939, he published a monograph on Handel's life and work. In 1955, he was a founding member and vice-president (later honorary member) of the Georg-Friedrich-Händel-Gesellschaft in Halle where Handel was born. He was then co-editor, with Max Schneider, of the Hallische Händel-Ausgabe, a new critical edition of the composer's complete works.

His contributions to the theory of rhythm and his reflections on musicology and music practice influenced further research. Many of his articles appeared in the Neue Zeitschrift für Musik (from 1922) and in Musica (from 1948).

== Publications ==
- Die Quaestiones in musica (dissertation, 1911)
- Die elementare Dynamik des musikalischen Rhythmus (habilitation thesis, 1930)
- Was weißt Du von Händel? (1931)
- Johann Sebastian Bach (1935)
- Mozarts Flügel klingt wieder (1937)
- Georg Friedrich Händel (1939)
- Robert Schumanns Kinderszenen (1949)
- Wege zu Bach (1949)
- Über die "kantable Art" der Musik Johann Sebastian Bachs (1957)
- * Tanzrhythmen in der Musik Johann Sebastian Bachs. (1962)
