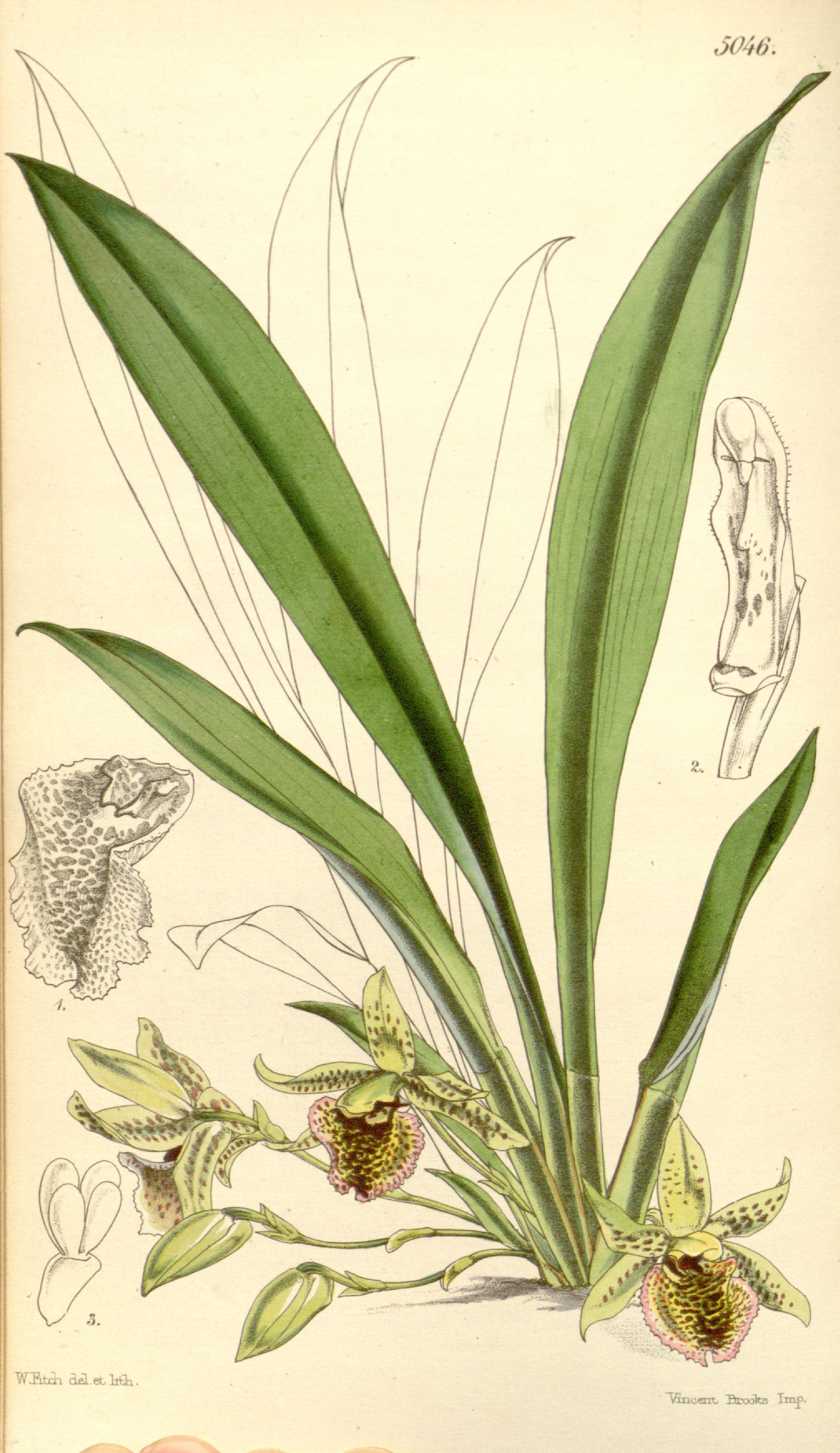
- Kefersteinia graminea 1858 illustration

Scientific classification
- Kingdom: Plantae
- Clade: Tracheophytes
- Clade: Angiosperms
- Clade: Monocots
- Order: Asparagales
- Family: Orchidaceae
- Subfamily: Epidendroideae
- Tribe: Cymbidieae
- Subtribe: Zygopetalinae
- Genus: Kefersteinia; Rchb.f.

Synonyms
- Senghasia Szlach.

= Kefersteinia (plant) =

Genus of orchids

Kefersteinia is a genus of flowering plants from the orchid family, Orchidaceae. It has about 40-50 species, widespread across much of Latin America. The genus was named for Keferstein of Kröllwitz, an orchidologist.

== Description ==
Plants of the genus are small sympodial orchids closely related to Chondrorhyncha, growing 12–20 cm (4.7–7.9 in) tall. Orchids have a long or short rhizome and lack pseudobulbs. Linear to lanceolate leaves form a fan shape, articulated to a sheath at their base. Single flowered inflorescences rise from the base or between leaves, often multiple at a time. Flowers are thin and translucent, with similar petals and sepals. The lip is broad and articulated to the column foot. The column is stout and keeled on the underside. Flowers have four pollinia.

== Distribution and habitat ==
Most species grow in the Andes mountains of Colombia and Ecuador, in shady, humid conditions. Most are epiphytic though some grow terrestrially in humus or moss.

== Ecology ==
Most flowers of the genus are pollinated by euglossine bees attracted by the flowers' fragrance. The hump of the lip forces bees to enter the flower from the side and pollinia are attached to the base of the bees antennae.

== Species ==
Species accepted by the Plants of the World Online as of 2022:

- Kefersteinia alata Pupulin
- Kefersteinia alba Schltr.
- Kefersteinia andreettae G.Gerlach, Neudecker & Seeger
- Kefersteinia angustifolia Pupulin & Dressler
- Kefersteinia auriculata Dressler
- Kefersteinia aurorae D.E.Benn. & Christenson
- Kefersteinia bengasahra D.E.Benn. & Christenson
- Kefersteinia bismarckii Dodson & D.E.Benn.
- Kefersteinia candida D.E.Benn. & Christenson
- Kefersteinia carolorum Carnevali & Cetzal
- Kefersteinia chocoensis G.Gerlach & Senghas
- Kefersteinia costaricensis Schltr.
- Kefersteinia delcastilloi D.E.Benn. & Christenson
- Kefersteinia elegans Garay
- Kefersteinia endresii Pupulin
- Kefersteinia escalerensis D.E.Benn. & Christenson
- Kefersteinia escobariana G.Gerlach & Neudecker
- Kefersteinia excentrica Dressler & Mora-Ret.
- Kefersteinia expansa (Rchb.f.) Rchb.f.
- Kefersteinia forcipata (Rchb.f.) P.A.Harding
- Kefersteinia gemma Rchb.f.
- Kefersteinia graminea (Lindl.) Rchb.f.
- Kefersteinia guacamayoana Dodson & Hirtz
- Kefersteinia heideri Neudecker
- Kefersteinia hirtzii Dodson
- Kefersteinia klabochii (Rchb.f.) Schltr.
- Kefersteinia koechliniorum Christenson
- Kefersteinia lactea (Rchb.f.) Schltr.
- Kefersteinia lafontainei Senghas & G.Gerlach
- Kefersteinia laminata Rchb.f.
- Kefersteinia lojae Schltr.
- Kefersteinia maculosa Dressler
- Kefersteinia medinae Pupulin & G.Merino
- Kefersteinia microcharis Schltr.
- Kefersteinia minutiflora Dodson
- Kefersteinia mystacina Rchb.f.
- Kefersteinia niesseniae P.Ortiz
- Kefersteinia ocellata Garay
- Kefersteinia orbicularis Pupulin
- Kefersteinia oscarii P.Ortiz
- Kefersteinia parvilabris Schltr.
- Kefersteinia pastorellii Dodson & D.E.Benn.
- Kefersteinia pellita Rchb.f. ex Dodson & D.E.Benn.
- Kefersteinia perlonga Dressler
- Kefersteinia pseudopellita P.A.Harding
- Kefersteinia pulchella Schltr.
- Kefersteinia pusilla (C.Schweinf.) C.Schweinf.
- Kefersteinia retanae G.Gerlach ex C.O.Morales
- Kefersteinia richardhegerlii R.Vásquez & Dodson
- Kefersteinia ricii R.Vásquez & Dodson
- Kefersteinia saccata Pupulin
- Kefersteinia salustianae D.E.Benn. & Christenson
- Kefersteinia sanguinolenta Rchb.f.
- Kefersteinia stapelioides Rchb.f.
- Kefersteinia stevensonii Dressler
- Kefersteinia taurina Rchb.f.
- Kefersteinia tinschertiana Pupulin
- Kefersteinia tolimensis Schltr.
- Kefersteinia trullata Dressler
- Kefersteinia vasquezii Dodson
- Kefersteinia villenae D.E.Benn. & Christenson
- Kefersteinia villosa D.E.Benn. & Christenson
- Kefersteinia wercklei Schltr.

== See also ==
- List of Orchidaceae genera
