= Franco of Liège =

Franco of Liège (died c. 1083) was an 11th-century mathematician who worked on squaring the circle. He was the chancellor (attested 1057) and later scholaster of Saint Lambert's Cathedral, Liège (before 1066-after 1083).

His De quadratura circuli, explaining his efforts to square the circle, was written around 1050. The musical treatise Quaestiones in musica, primarily ascribed to Rudolf of St Trond, has also been attributed to him. Sigebert of Gembloux ascribes to him other works, including some saints' lives, a poem (ligno crucis) and a treatise on the ember days (De Jejunio IIIIor temporum).

Cosmas of Prague was his student.
