= Romelia Lichtenstein =

German opera singer

Romelia Lichtenstein, also Romelia Assenowa-Lichtenstein (12 March 1962 in Sofia) is a German opera, operetta, oratorio, lied and concert soprano. After an apprenticeship as children's nurse she studied vocals at the University of Music and Theatre Leipzig. In June 2012 she was appointed Kammersängerin by the city of Halle.

== Awards ==
- 1990: First prize in the Young Opera Singers competition
- 1998: best opera singer by magazine Opernwelt
- 2016: Handel Prize der Stadt Halle an der Saale.

== Discography ==
- Georg Friedrich Händel, Admeto, 2 DVDs + 2 CDs, Arthaus Musik
- Karl Ditters von Dittersdorf, Giob (Oratorium), CD, cpo
- Engelbert Humperdinck, Hänsel und Gretel, DVD, NCA*
