= Theodor Levin =

German art historian

Theodor Levin (life dates unknown) was a German art historian and art writer. Until the early 1890s, he worked as curator and librarian of art and literature as well as professor of art history at the Kunstakademie Düsseldorf.

== Life ==
Little is known about Levin's life. As successor to Karl Woermann, Levin became curator of the art and literature collection and teacher of art history at the Kunstakademie Düsseldorf. As such, he was succeeded by Friedrich Schaarschmidt in the early 1890s. Of particular importance for the history of art are his Repertorium about the collections of the Kunstakademie Düsseldorf (1883), his biography of the painter Eduard Bendemann (1885) as well as his Beiträge zur Geschichte der Kunstbestrebungen in dem Hause Pfalz-Neuburg (1904–1910).

In 1894 Levin lived in Düsseldorf-Pempelfort at Scheibenstraße 2.

== Publications ==
- Repertorium der bei der Königl. Kunst-Akademie zu Düsseldorf aufbewahrten Sammlungen. A. Bagel, Düsseldorf 1883 (Numerized).
- Bendemann, Eduard Julius Friedrich. In Julius Meyer et al. (ed.): Allgemeines Künstler-Lexikon. Vol. 3, Leipzig 1885, pp. 504–511
- Verzeichniss der in der Kunsthalle zu Düsseldorf ausgestellten Bilder von älteren Meistern. A. Bagel, Düsseldorf 1886 (Numerized)
- Das Grabdenkmal des Herzogs Wilhelm von Jülich-Cleve-Berg in der Sct. Lambertuskirche zu Düsseldorf. In Beiträge zur Geschichte des Niederrheins, vol. 1 (1886), p. 175 (Numerized)
- Eine gefälschte Gemäldesammlung. In Kunstchronik: Wochenschrift für Kunst und Kunstgewerbe, 22. Jahrgang (1886/1887), Nr. 42, pp. 673–680 (Numerized)
- Zur Frage der Bilderfälschung. A. Bagel, Düsseldorf 1887
- Noch ein Wort in Sachen des Städelschen Instituts. In Kunstchronik: Wochenschrift für Kunst und Kunstgewerbe. 23. Jahrgang (1887/1888), Sp. 252–258, 281–290
- Noch ein Wort zur Erinnerung an Eduard Bendemann. In Kunstchronik: Wochenschrift für Kunst und Kunstgewerbe. Neue Folge, Heft 1 (1889/1890), Sp. 333–338 (Numerized)
- Ein Heiratsprojekt im pfalzneuburgischen Hause. In Düsseldorfer Jahrbuch. Jahrgang 15 (1900), pp. 366–373
- Beiträge zur Geschichte der Kunstbestrebungen in dem Hause Pfalz-Neuburg. In Düsseldorfer Jahrbuch. Jahrgang 19 (1904), pp. 97–213; Jahrgang 20 (1905), pp. 123–249 (Numerized); Jahrgang 23 (1910), pp. 1–185
