= Siegfried Voß =

German actor

Siegfried Voß (16 June 1940, in Königsberg – 22 April 2011, in Halle) was a German actor and winner of the 1987 Handel Prize presented by the city of Halle.

== Sources ==
- Günter Helmes, Steffi Schültzke (editors): Das Fernsehtheater Moritzburg. Institution und Spielplan. Leipziger Universitätsverlag, Leipzig 2003. ISBN 3-936522-99-5.
- Claudia Kusebauch (editor): Fernsehtheater Moritzburg II. Programmgeschichte. Leipziger Universitätsverlag, Leipzig 2005. ISBN 3-86583-015-3.
- Claudia Kusebauch (in collaboration with Michael Grisko): Das Fernsehtheater Moritzburg – Programmchronologie. Ebd., p. 15–208.
