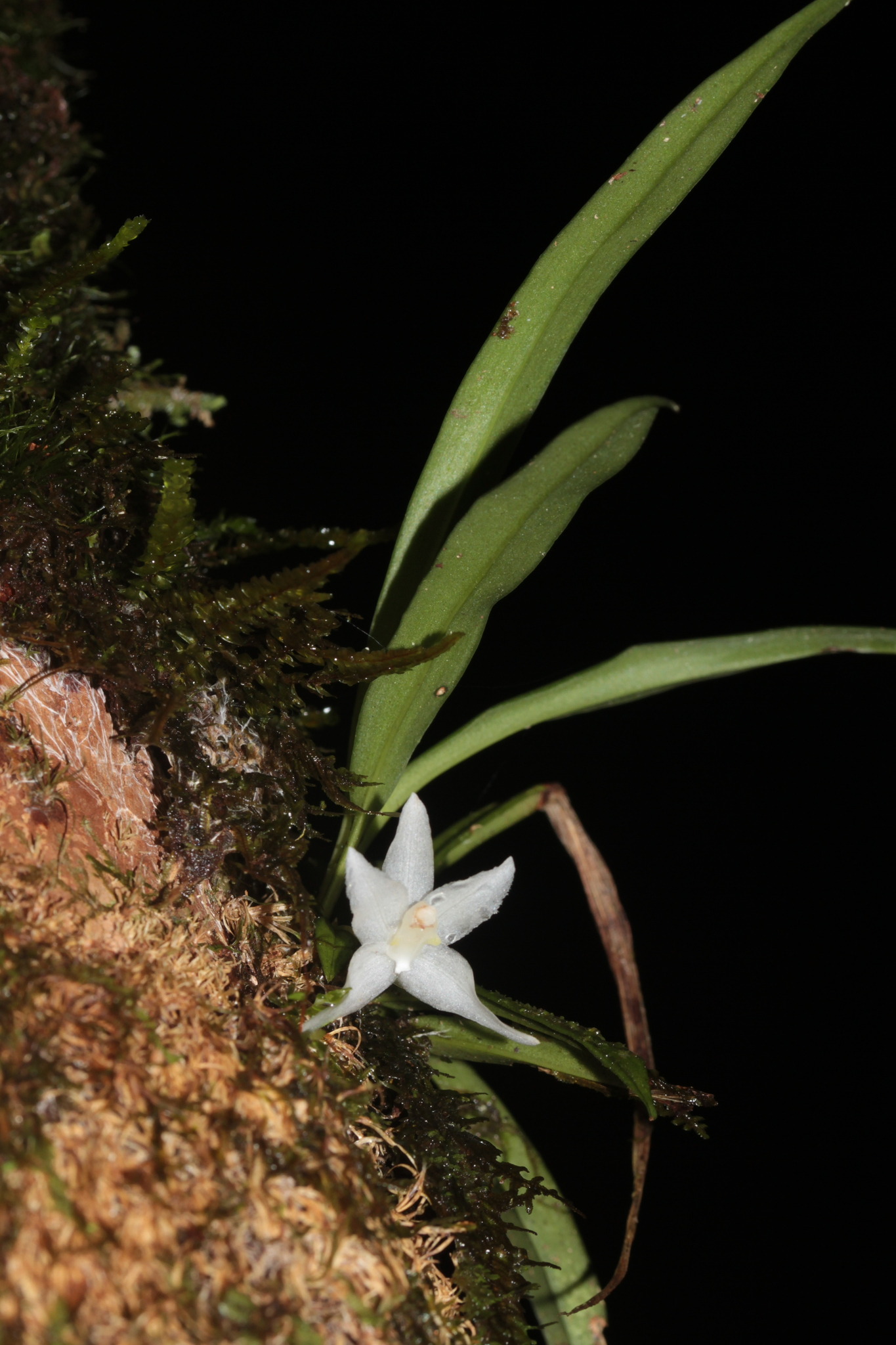

Scientific classification
- Kingdom: Plantae
- Clade: Tracheophytes
- Clade: Angiosperms
- Clade: Monocots
- Order: Asparagales
- Family: Orchidaceae
- Subfamily: Epidendroideae
- Genus: Kefersteinia
- Species: K. lafontainei

Binomial name
- Kefersteinia lafontainei Senghas & G.Gerlach

= Kefersteinia lafontainei =

Genus of flowering plant

Kefersteinia lafontainei is a species of flowering plant from the genus Kefersteinia.

== Description ==
Kefersteinia lafontainei is an epiphytic orchid.
