= Hermann Board =

German architect and art historian

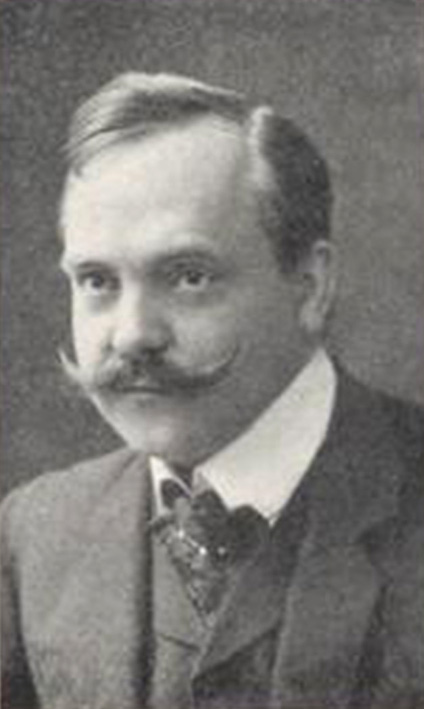
Hermann Board

Hermann Board (13 October 1867 – 21 February 1918) was a German architect and art historian.

== Life ==
Born in Essen, Board was the son of the master mason Hermann Board (d. 1869) and attended the municipal Realschule in Essen. He then completed a four-year apprenticeship as an architect and attended the municipal further education school in Essen, the commercial technical school in Cologne and the Technische Hochschule in Charlottenburg (now Technische Universität Berlin). Afterwards, he worked for seven years in the construction office of the mining company Krupp-Gussstahlfabrik and also taught in the construction classes of the municipal technical and further education schools in Essen. This was followed by four years as a self-employed architect in Essen before he completed his studies in art history at the Rheinische Friedrich-Wilhelms-Universität Bonn with Paul Clemen, at the University of Strasbourg with Georg Dehio and at the Ruprecht-Karls-Universität Heidelberg with Henry Thode. In 1903, he received his doctorate in Heidelberg with a dissertation on the church St. Maria im Kapitol in Cologne. In the same year, he was succeeded by Friedrich Schaarschmidt, curator of art collections, librarian and secretary of the Kunstakademie Düsseldorf, where he also taught art history. In 1908 he received the title of professor.

Board died in Düsseldorf at the age of 51.

== Publications ==
- S. Maria im Kapitol zu Köln. Ein Beitrag zur Geschichte der frühromanischen Baukunst am Niederrhein. Dissertation, Heidelberg 1904. (Numerized)
