= Friedrich Schaarschmidt =

German painter (1863–1902)

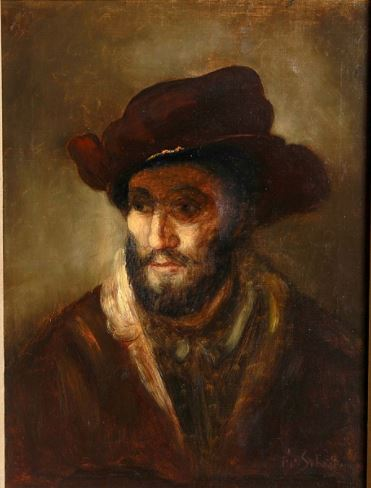
Portrait of an unidentified man

Friedrich Schaarschmidt (4 February 1863 – 12 June 1902) was a German landscape painter and figure painter of the Düsseldorf school of painting, conservator and art writer.

== Life ==
Born in Bonn, Schaarschmidt was born in Bonn as the son of Professor Carl Schaarschmidt (1822-1908), a philosophy historian and head of the Bonn University Library. From 1880 until 1889, he studied painting at the Kunstakademie Düsseldorf. There, Hugo Crola, Johann Peter Theodor Janssen and Wilhelm Sohn, temporarily also Eduard von Gebhardt and Carl Ernst Forberg, were his teachers. As a practising artist, Schaarschmidt turned to En plein air. He often decorated his landscape paintings with figures in antique robes.

At the request of Peter Janssen, Schaarschmidt 1893 was appointed curator of the art collection of the Düsseldorf Academy as successor of Theodor Levin. As such, he also held a teaching position. He began to make a name for himself as an art writer and as an employee of the art magazine Die Kunst und das schöne Heim. His most important writing is considered to be the work Zur Geschichte der Düsseldorfer Kunst, which was published in 1902 by the Kunstverein für die Rheinlande und Westfalen. He was also a member of the Düsseldorfer Masonic lodge Rose und Akazie.

In 1901 a severe illness made him visit Böblingen near Stuttgart for convalescence. There he died at the age of 39 years. He was succeeded as curator of the art collections, librarian and secretary of the academy of arts by Hermann Board.

== Work ==
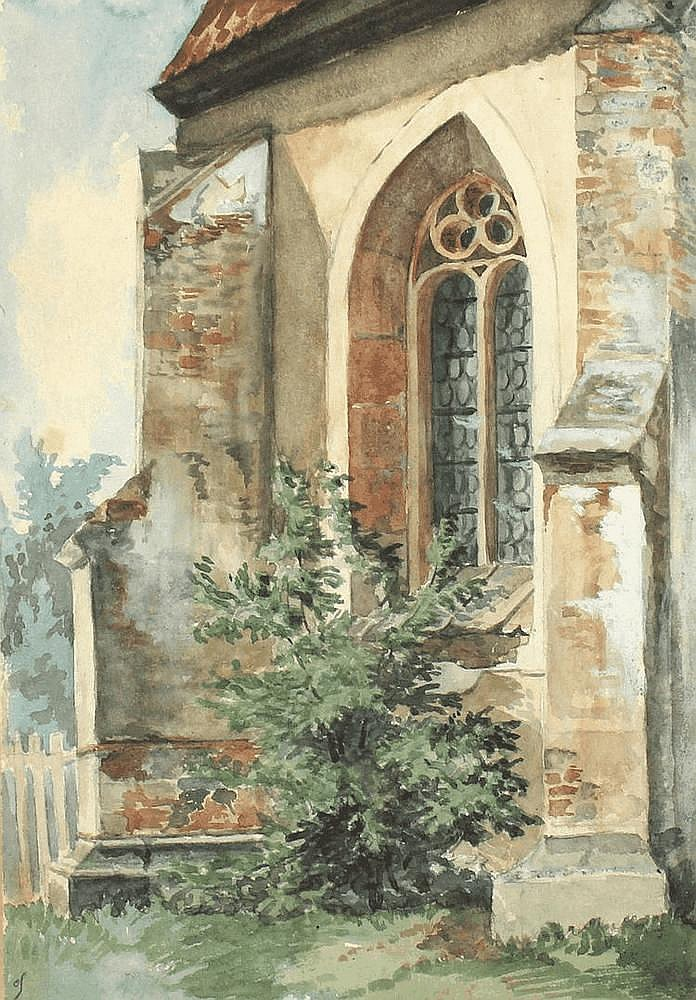
A Chapel with a Window

- Reichskanzler Fürst Bismarck, Bremer allgemeine Kunstausstellung 1890
- Faun und Nymphen, Berliner internationale Kunstausstellung 1891
- Sommer, Große Berliner Kunstausstellung 1895
- Auf dem Posilipp, Berliner internationale Kunstausstellung 1896
- Capri, Große Berliner Kunstausstellung 1897
- Friedrich Schaarschmidt, Selbstbildnis im Gewand des 17. Jahrhunderts, ein Glas ausleerend, Radierung, um 1900
- Vieni, Figurenmalerei
- Capri, Landschaftsgemälde
- Motiv einer Kapelle mit Fenstern, Aquarell

=== Writings, magazine articles ===
- Gabriel Grupello und seine Broncestatuette des Kurfürsten Johann Wilhelm im Jägerhof zu Düsseldorf. Düsseldorf 1896
- Fürstliche Bildnisse in der Gemäldesammlung der Kgl. Kunstakademie zu Düsseldorf. In Beiträge zur Geschichte des Niederrheins. Jahrbuch des Düsseldorfer Geschichts-Vereins. Elfter Band, Düsseldorf 1897, pp. 28–63 (Numerized)
- Zur Erinnerung an Jakobea of Baden, Herzogin von Jülich-Cleve-Berg, gest. am 3. Sept. 1597. Düsseldorf 1897
- Eduard von Gebhardt (Zum sechzigsten Geburtstag des Künstlers, 13. Juni 1898). In Kunst für alle. Issue 17, 1 June 1898, p. 257 (Numerized)
- Die Düsseldorfer Künstler-Vereinigung 1899. In Die Kunst für alle. Issue 16, 15 May 1899, p. 246 f. (Numerized)
- Fritz Roeber. In Die Kunst für alle. Issue 9, 1 February 1901, pp. 201–207 (Numerized)
- Verzeichnis der Gemälde der Kgl. Kunst-Akademie zu Düsseldorf. Düsseldorf 1901
- Aus Kunst und Leben. Studien und Reisebilder. Munich 1901 (Numerized)
- Zur Geschichte der Düsseldorfer Kunst, insbesondere im XIX. Jahrhundert. Kunstverein für die Rheinlande und Westfalen, Düsseldorf 1902 (Numerized 1, Numerized 2, Numerized 3)
