= Horst Deichfuß =

German writer (1925–1989)

Horst Deichfuß (11 April 1925 – 6 October 1989) was a German writer.

== Life ==
Born in Halberstadt, In 1943 Deichfuß was drafted for military service and in 1945/46 was a US-American or British prisoner of war.

After his return from captivity in 1947 he passed the Abitur. He then worked as a mailman for the Deutsche Post der DDR. In 1948 he joined the Socialist Unity Party of Germany. In 1955 he founded a cultural group at the Deutsche Post in Halle. In 1961 he completed a correspondence course in postal economics at the engineering school "Rosa Luxemburg" in Leipzig.

From 1963 to 1965 Deichfuß studied at the German Institute for Literature in Leipzig. In 1965/66 he was a lecturer for theatre and literature at the Halle City Council. From 1966 to 1969 he was the district secretary of the Writers' Association Halle. From 1967 to 1972 he headed a Zirkel Schreibender Arbeiter. From 1969 he was active as a freelance author.

Deichfuß died in Halle after a short severe illness at the age of 64.

== Work ==
- Serpentinen (novel). Mitteldeutscher Verlag, Halle (Saale) 1962.
- Anna Mater. Drei Frauenschicksale (tales). List, Leipzig 1971.
- Die Nagelprobe (novel). List, Leipzig 1974.
- Wiederaufnahme (novel). List, Leipzig 1977
- Windmacher (novel). List, Leipzig 1983.
- Rumänische Rhapsodie. Literarische Skizzen. Verlag der Nation, Berlin 1987.
