= Rudolf of St Trond =

Rudolf of St Trond (also Rodulf, Rodolfus, Rodolphe, Radulphus, Rudolph, or Raoul, c. 1070–1138) was a Benedictine abbot of St Trond Abbey, chronicler and composer.

A musical treatise Quaestiones in musica was attributed to him by the musicologist Rudolf Steglich; another suggestion is Franco of Liège.

He wrote a chronicle Gesta Abbatum Trudonensium, on the abbots of his abbey, beginning in 999; it is included in the Paleographie musicale and the Monumenta Germaniae Historica. His description of monastic life includes details of musical practice and training methods of Guido of Arezzo. Historian Henri de Lubac wrote that he showed "a very exacting and almost combative idea of historical truth."
