= Roswitha Berndt =

German historian

Roswitha Berndt (born 1936 in Spottau) is a German historian who worked mostly on the era of the Weimar Republic.

Berndt studied history with Leo Stern. In 1975, she was appointed professor for history ("Geschichte/Staatsbürgerkunde") at the Martin Luther University of Halle-Wittenberg.

== Works ==
Works by Berndt are held by the German National Library:

- Wirtschaftliche Mitteleuropapläne des deutschen Imperialismus (1926-1931). Zur Rolle des Mitteleuropäischen Wirtschaftstages und der Mitteleuropa-Institute in den imperialistischen deutschen Expansionsplänen. in Wissenschaftliche Zeitschrift der Martin-Luther-Universität Halle-Wittenberg, XIV. Jg., issue 4, 1965 ISSN 0438-4385.
- with Hans Hübner: Lage und Kampf der Landarbeiter im ostelbischen Preussen 3 (1919 - 1945) (1985)
- Unternehmer in Sachsen-Anhalt, Berlin: Trafo-Verlag Weist, 1999
