= Kröllwitz =

- Quarter of Halle (Saale)
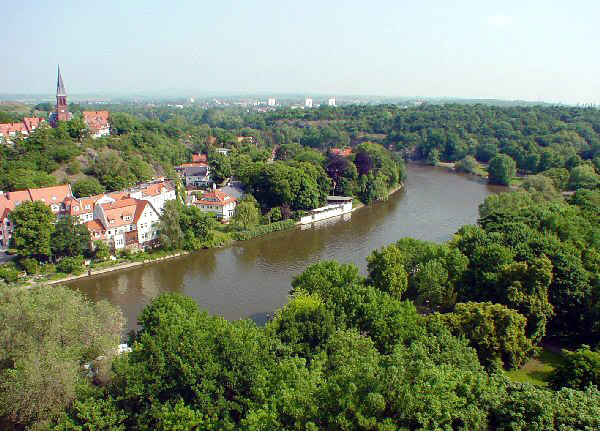
- View over Kröllwitz from Giebichenstein Castle

- Location of Kröllwitz in Halle (Saale)
- Interactive map of Kröllwitz
- Location within Germany Location within Saxony-Anhalt
- Coordinates: 51°30′20″N 11°56′59″E
- Country: Germany
- State: Saxony-Anhalt
- City: Halle (Saale)
- Borough: West
- Founded: 1291

Population (2015-12-31)
  - Total: 5,445
- Time zone: UTC+01:00 (CET)
  - Summer (DST): UTC+02:00 (CEST)
- Postal codes: 06120
- Vehicle registration: HAL

Kröllwitz is a village and locality (Ortsteil) in the West borough (Stadtbezirk West) of Halle (Saale). It is located in the German state Saxony-Anhalt.

== Geography ==
The center of Kröllwitz is located on a hill. There is the Petruskirche and the primary school of Kröllwitz. A part of Weinberg Campus, one of the biggest technology parks in eastern Germany, is located in the southern part of the quarter. The hospital of the Martin Luther University of Halle-Wittenberg takes a big area between the old part of Kröllwitz and Weinberg Campus. In the east, it is bordered by the river Saale. In the north, you can see the Ochsenberg (English: 'oxen mountain').

== History ==
Kröllwitz was mentioned as Crolewitz in 1291 for the first time. It was a sorbian fisher village.
