= Handel House =

Music museum in Halle (Saale), Germany, at the birthplace of George Frederic Handel

- Händel-Haus
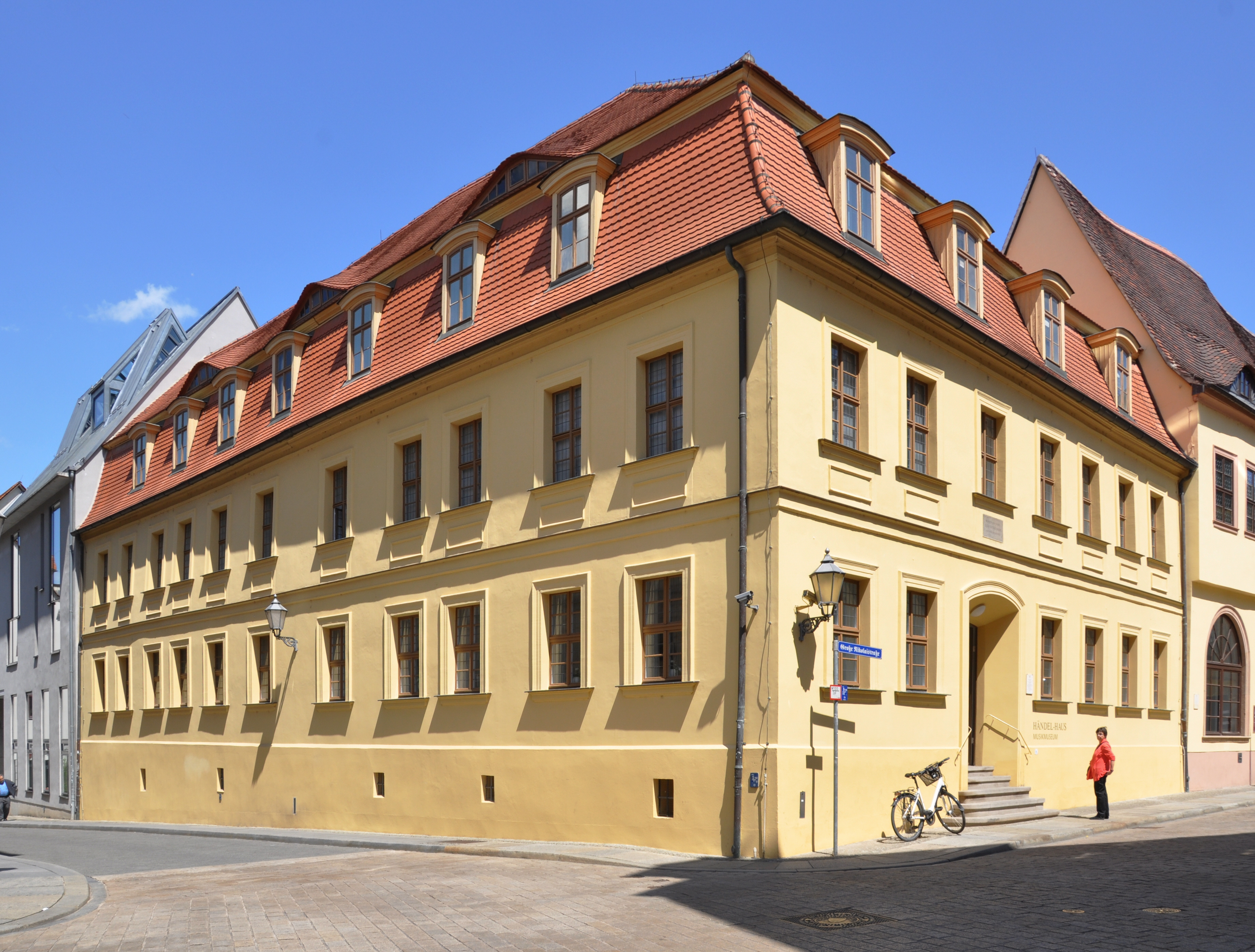

General information
- Location: Große Nikolaistraße 5; 06108 Halle (Saale), Germany
- Coordinates: 51°29′3″N 11°58′1″E

Website
- haendelhaus.de/en

Handel House (German: Händel-Haus) is a cultural site in Halle in Saxony-Anhalt, Germany. The composer George Frideric Handel was born here in 1685; it is now a museum, and houses a collection relating to the composer and to the musical history of Halle.

== History ==
The house, which may date back to the 15th century, has its earliest documented mention in 1558. It was purchased in 1666 by Georg Händel, ducal valet and surgeon. His son George Frideric Handel was born here on 23 February 1685, and lived here until 1703, when he moved to Hamburg.

The house remained in the family until 1783, after which time, until 1937, it was owned by a succession of merchants. In 1922 Hallische Händel-Verein (Handel Society of Halle), and also Newman Flower, an English writer about Handel, endeavoured to purchase it, but were not successful.

In 1937 it was purchased by the City of Halle, and was opened as a music museum in 1948. In 1985, the 300th anniversary of the composer's birth, the museum was extended by including neighbouring historical buildings. In 2003 the Handel House was included in the list of cultural heritage sites in the Blaubuch (Blue Book) of the federal government. A private foundation, Stiftung Händel-Haus, was established in 2008.

== Collections ==
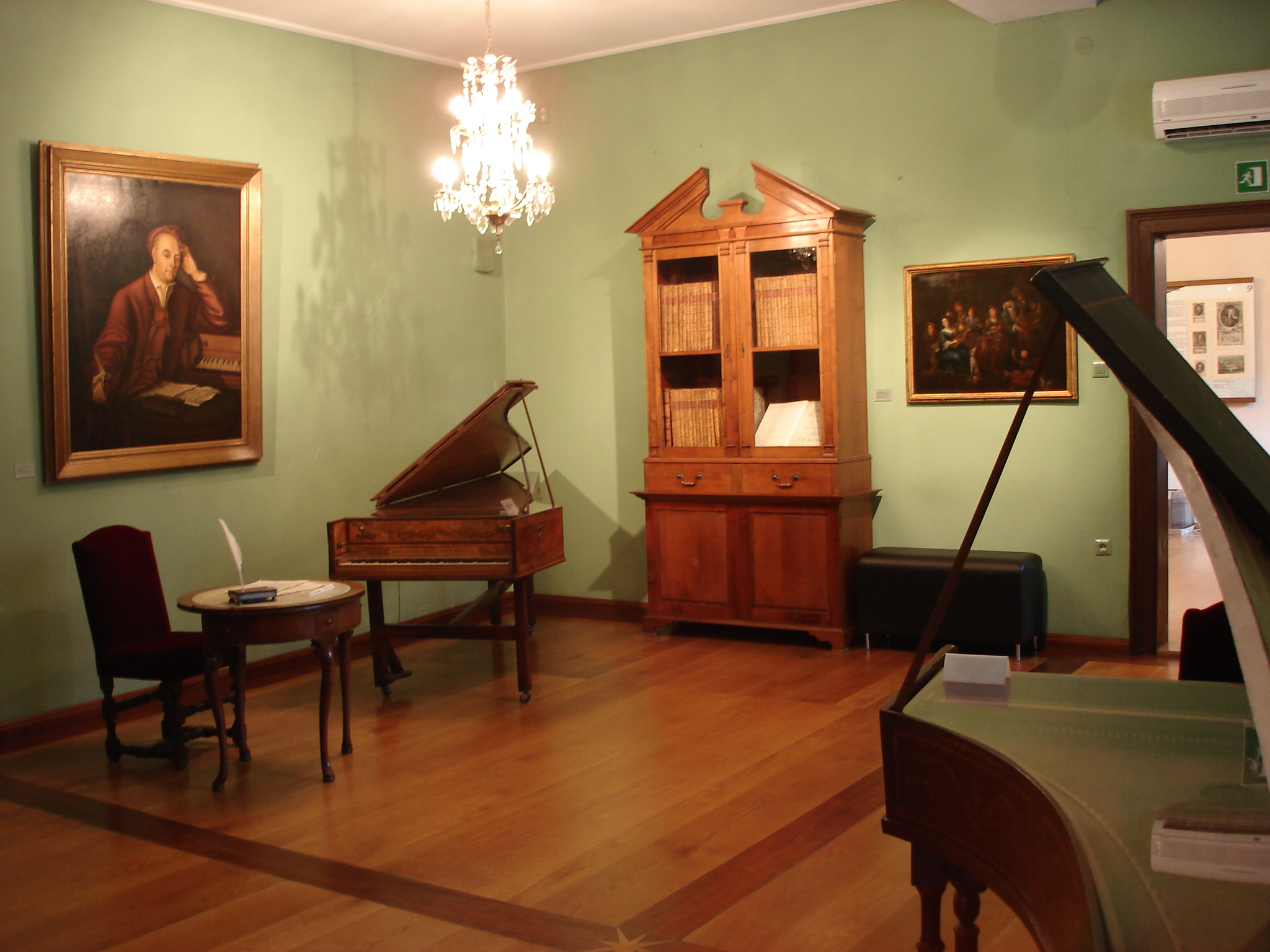
A room in the museum in 2006

There is a collection of about 700 musical instruments, not only of the Baroque period. There is also a collection of documents (about 1,000 items); pictures, relating to Handel and his time, and to the musical history of Halle; books, including first editions of works by Handel and by other composers of Halle; and other musical items.

== See also ==
- List of music museums
- Wilhelm Friedemann Bach House in Halle
