= Halle Radio Tower =

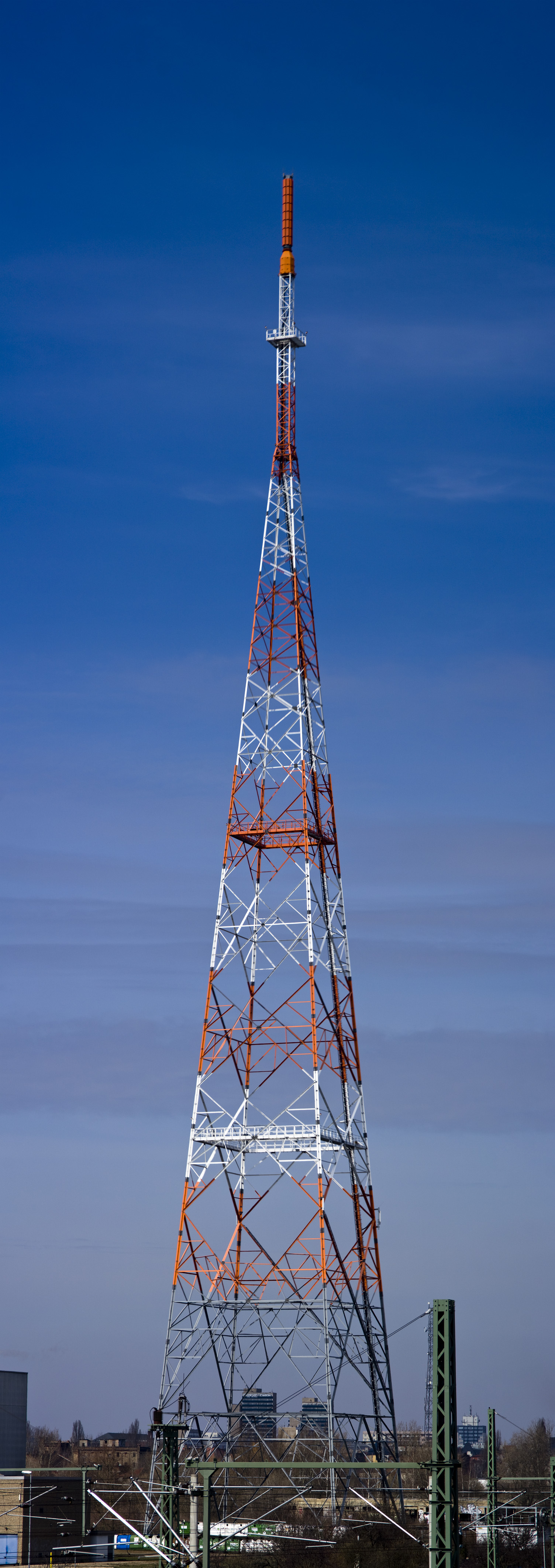
- Location: Halle, Saxony-Anhalt, Germany
- Tower height: 150 m (490 ft)
- Coordinates: 51°27′39″N 11°59′36″E
- Built: 2005

Halle Radio Tower is the tallest free-standing lattice tower exclusively used for radiotechnical purposes in Germany. It was built in 2005 by Steffens & Nölle GmbH for the Deutsche Telekom AG in Halle, Saxony-Anhalt as DVB-T broadcasting tower. It is 150 metres tall.

== See also ==
- List of towers
