= Werther =

1892 opera by Jules Massenet

- drame lyrique by Jules Massenet
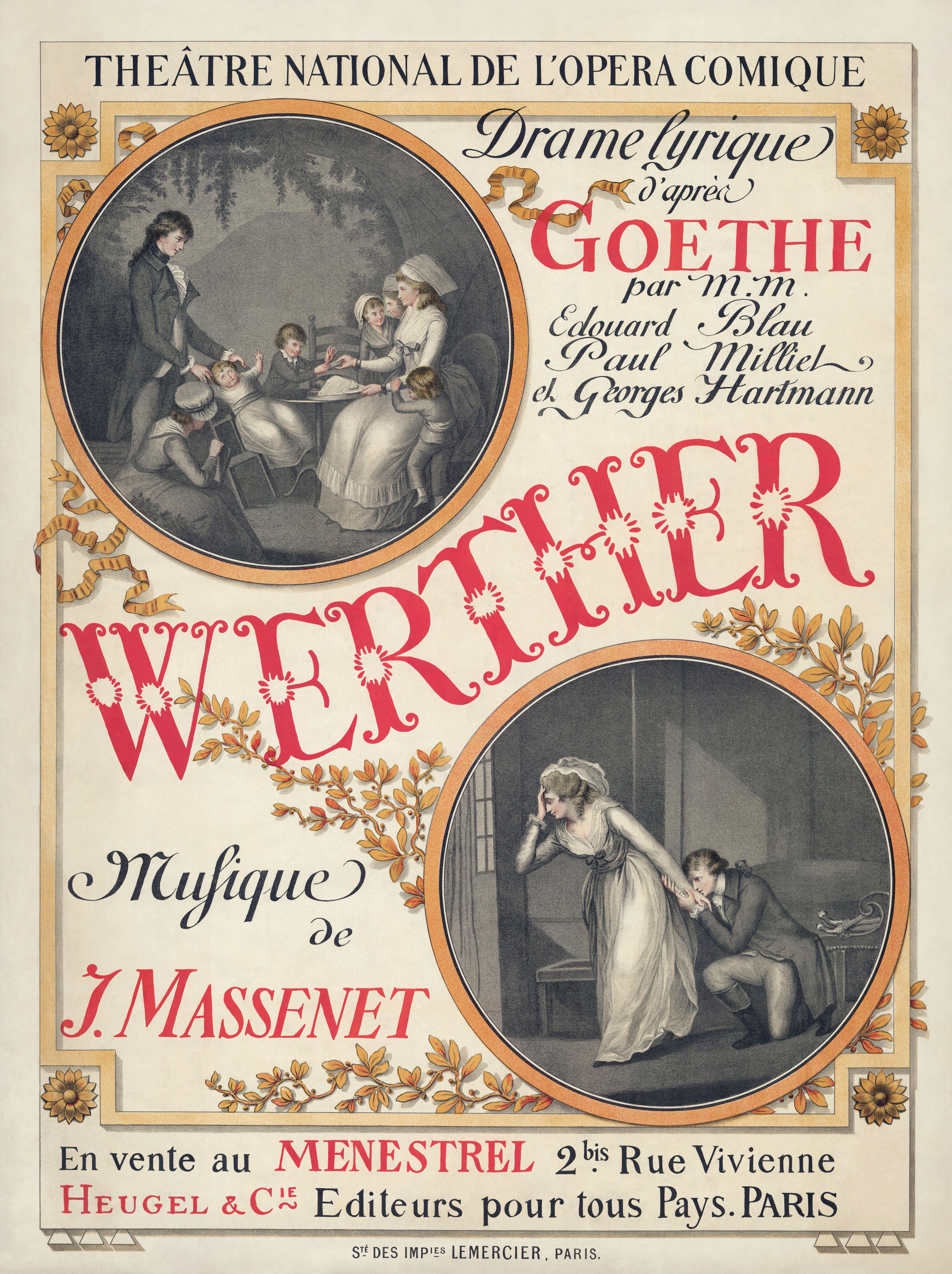
- Grasset poster for 1893 French premiere of Werther
- Librettist: Édouard Blau; Paul Milliet; Georges Hartmann
- Language: French
- Based on: Die Leiden des jungen Werther by Johann Wolfgang Goethe
- Premiere: 16 February 1892; Hofoper, Vienna (in German)

Werther is an opera (drame lyrique) in four acts by Jules Massenet to a French libretto by Édouard Blau, Paul Milliet and Georges Hartmann (who used the pseudonym Henri Grémont). It is loosely based on Goethe's epistolary novel The Sorrows of Young Werther, which itself was based on Goethe's own early life. Earlier examples of operas using the story were made by Kreutzer (1792) and Pucitta (1802).

== Performance history ==
Massenet started composing Werther in 1885, completing it in 1887. He submitted it to Léon Carvalho, the director of the Paris Opéra-Comique, that year, but Carvalho declined to accept it on the grounds that the scenario was too serious. With the disruption of the fire at the Opéra-Comique and Massenet's work on other operatic projects (especially Esclarmonde), it was put to one side, until the Vienna Opera, pleased with the success of Manon, asked the composer for a new work. Werther received its premiere on 16 February 1892 (in a German version translated by Max Kalbeck) at the Imperial Theatre Hofoper in Vienna.

The French-language premiere followed in Geneva on 27 December 1892. The first performance in France was given by the Opéra-Comique at the Théâtre Lyrique on the Place du Châtelet in Paris on 16 January 1893, with Marie Delna as Charlotte and Guillaume Ibos in the title role, conducted by Jules Danbé, but was not immediately successful.

Werther entered the repertoire at the Opéra-Comique in 1903 in a production supervised by Albert Carré, and over the next half-century the opera was performed over 1,100 times there, Léon Beyle becoming a distinguished interpreter of Werther.

The United States premiere with the Metropolitan Opera took place in Chicago on 29 March 1894 and then in the company's main house in New York City three weeks later. The UK premiere was a one-off performance at Covent Garden, London, on 11 June 1894 with Emma Eames as Charlotte, Sigrid Arnoldson as Sophie, and Jean de Reszke in the title role.

Werther is still regularly performed around the world and has been recorded many times. Although the role of Werther was written for a tenor, Massenet adjusted it for a baritone, when Mattia Battistini sang it in Saint Petersburg in 1902. It is very occasionally performed in this version, in which the changes affect only the vocal line for the title character. There are no other changes to the words, to the lines for other characters, or to the orchestration.

== Roles ==
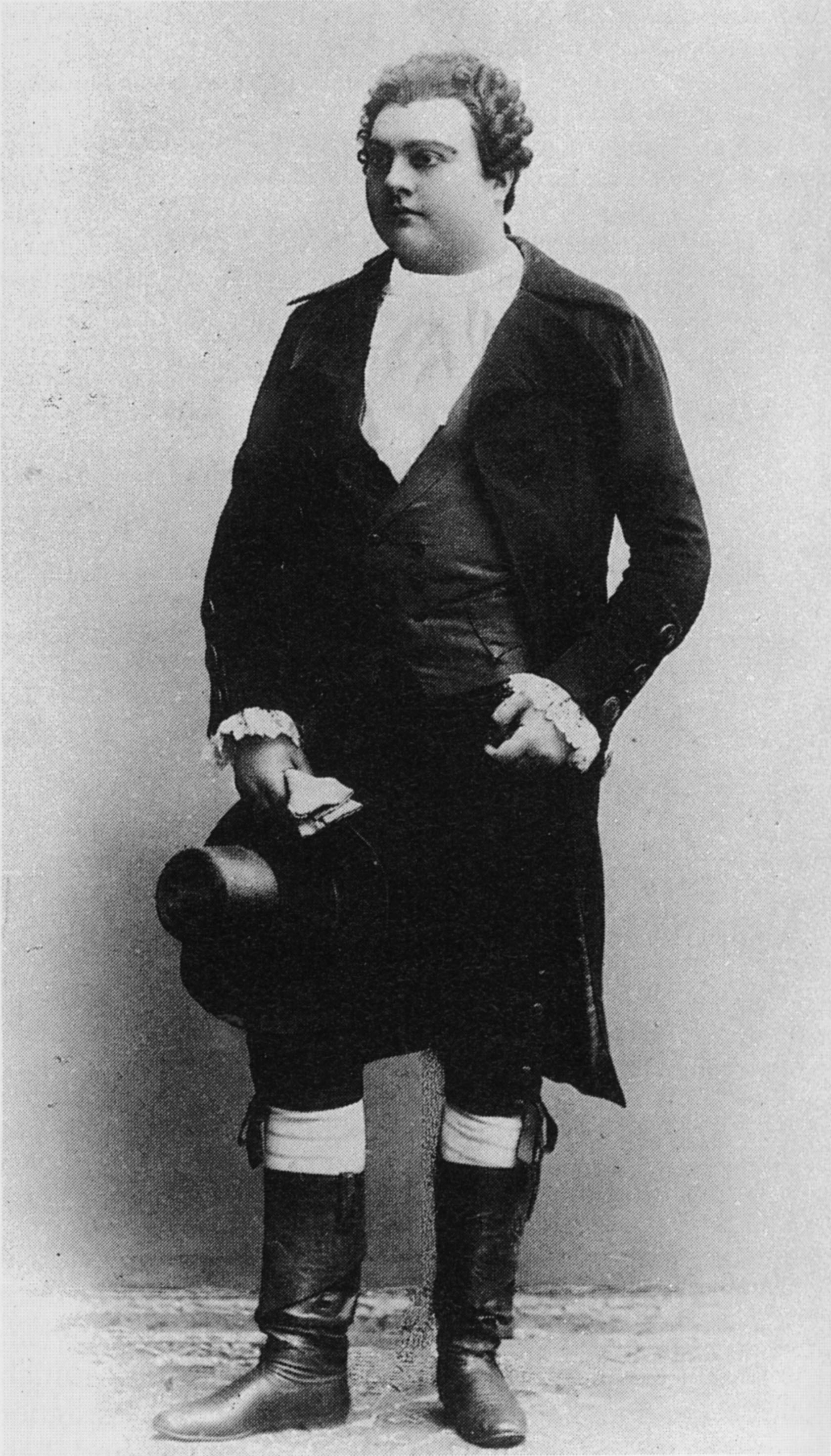
Ernest van Dyck in the title role, its first singer, ca. 1892

Role	Voice type	Premiere cast, 16 February 1892 (Conductor: Wilhelm Jahn)
Charlotte, aged 20	mezzo-soprano	Marie Renard
Sophie, her sister, aged 15	soprano	Ellen Brandt-Forster
Werther, a young poet, aged 23	tenor	Ernest van Dyck
Albert, betrothed to Charlotte; aged 25	baritone	Franz Neidl
Le Bailli, Charlotte's father; aged 50	bass	Karl Mayerhofer
Schmidt, a friend of the Bailli	tenor	Anton Schlittenhelm
Johann, a friend of the Bailli	baritone	Benedikt Felix
Brühlmann, a young man	tenor	August Stoll
Käthchen, Brühlmann's fiancée of seven years	mezzo-soprano	Emma Karlona
Children of the Bailli – Fritz, Max, Hans, Karl, Gretel, Clara	children's voices	
Inhabitants of Wetzlar, guests, servants; off-stage women's and children's voices

== Instrumentation ==
2 flutes (2nd doubling piccolo), 2 oboes (doubling English horns), 2 clarinets in B-flat and A, alto saxophone, 2 bassoons, 4 horns in F, 2 cornets in B-flat and A, 3 trombones, tuba, timpani, percussion (1) (bass drum, triangle), harp, strings.

== Synopsis ==
Time: Within the period July to December in 1772.
Place: Wetzlar in Germany.

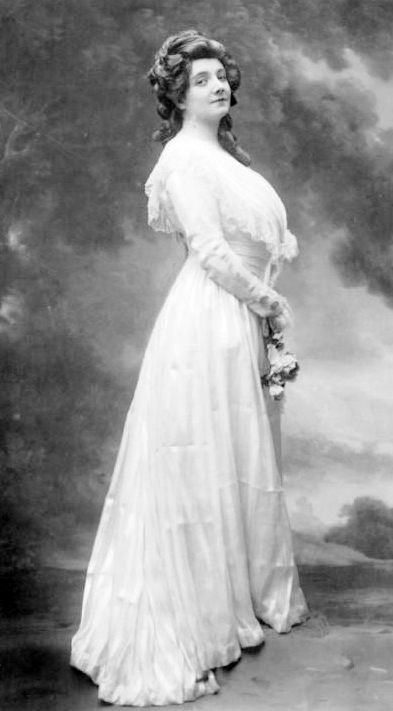
Claire Croiza as Charlotte in 1907

=== Act 1 ===
In July, the widowed Bailiff (a Magistrate, rather than one who comes to seize property), is teaching his six youngest children a Christmas carol ("Noël! Jésus vient de naître"). His drinking companions, Johann and Schmidt, arrive as Charlotte, the eldest daughter, dresses for a ball. Since her fiancé Albert is away, she is to be escorted by Werther, whom the Bailiff and his companions find gloomy. Werther arrives ("O Nature, pleine de grâce"), and watches as Charlotte prepares her young siblings' supper, just as her mother had before she died. He greets her and they leave for the ball. Albert returns unexpectedly after a six-month trip. He is unsure of Charlotte's intentions and disappointed not to find her at home, but is reassured and consoled by Charlotte's younger sister Sophie. He leaves after promising to return in the morning. After an orchestral interlude, Werther and Charlotte return very late; he is already enamoured of her. His declaration of love is interrupted by the announcement of Albert's return. Charlotte recalls how she promised her dying mother she would marry Albert. Werther is in despair.

=== Act 2 ===
It is three months later, and Charlotte and Albert are now married. They walk happily to church to celebrate the minister's 50th wedding anniversary, followed by the disconsolate Werther ("Un autre est son époux!"). First Albert and then Sophie ("Du gai soleil, plein de flamme") try to cheer him up. When Charlotte exits the church, he speaks to her of their first meeting. Charlotte begs Werther to leave her, though she indicates that she would be willing to receive him again on Christmas Day. Werther contemplates suicide ("Lorsque l'enfant revient d'un voyage"). He encounters Sophie but the tearful girl does not understand his distressing behavior. Albert now realizes that Werther loves Charlotte.

=== Act 3 ===
"Va! laisse couler mes larmes"
Charlotte in act 3, sung by Jeanette Ekornåsvåg

Charlotte is at home alone on Christmas Eve. She spends time rereading the letters that she has received from Werther ("Werther! Qui m'aurait dit ... Ces lettres!"), wondering how the young poet is and how she had the strength to send him away. Sophie comes in and tries to cheer up her older sister ("Ah! le rire est béni"), though Charlotte is not to be consoled ("Va! laisse couler mes larmes"). Suddenly Werther appears, and while he reads to her some poetry of Ossian ("Pourquoi me réveiller?"), he realizes that she does indeed return his love. They embrace for a moment, but she quickly bids him farewell. He leaves with thoughts of suicide. Albert returns home to find his wife distraught. Werther sends a messenger to Albert, requesting to borrow his pistols, explaining he is going on an extended trip. After the servant has taken them, Charlotte has a terrible premonition and hurries to find Werther. An orchestral intermezzo ("La nuit de Noël") leads without a break into the final Act.

=== Act 4 ===
"The death of Werther": At Werther's apartment, Charlotte has arrived too late to stop him from shooting himself; he is dying. She consoles him by declaring her love. He asks for forgiveness. After he dies, Charlotte faints. Outside children are heard singing the Christmas carol.

== Noted arias ==
Act 1

Werther: "O Nature, pleine de grâce"

Act 2

Werther: "Un autre est son époux!"
Sophie: "Du gai soleil, plein de flamme"
Werther: "Lorsque l'enfant revient d'un voyage"

Act 3

Charlotte: "Werther! Qui m'aurait dit /Ces lettres!" (Letter Scene)
Charlotte: "Va! laisse couler mes larmes"
Werther: "Pourquoi me réveiller?"

== Recordings ==
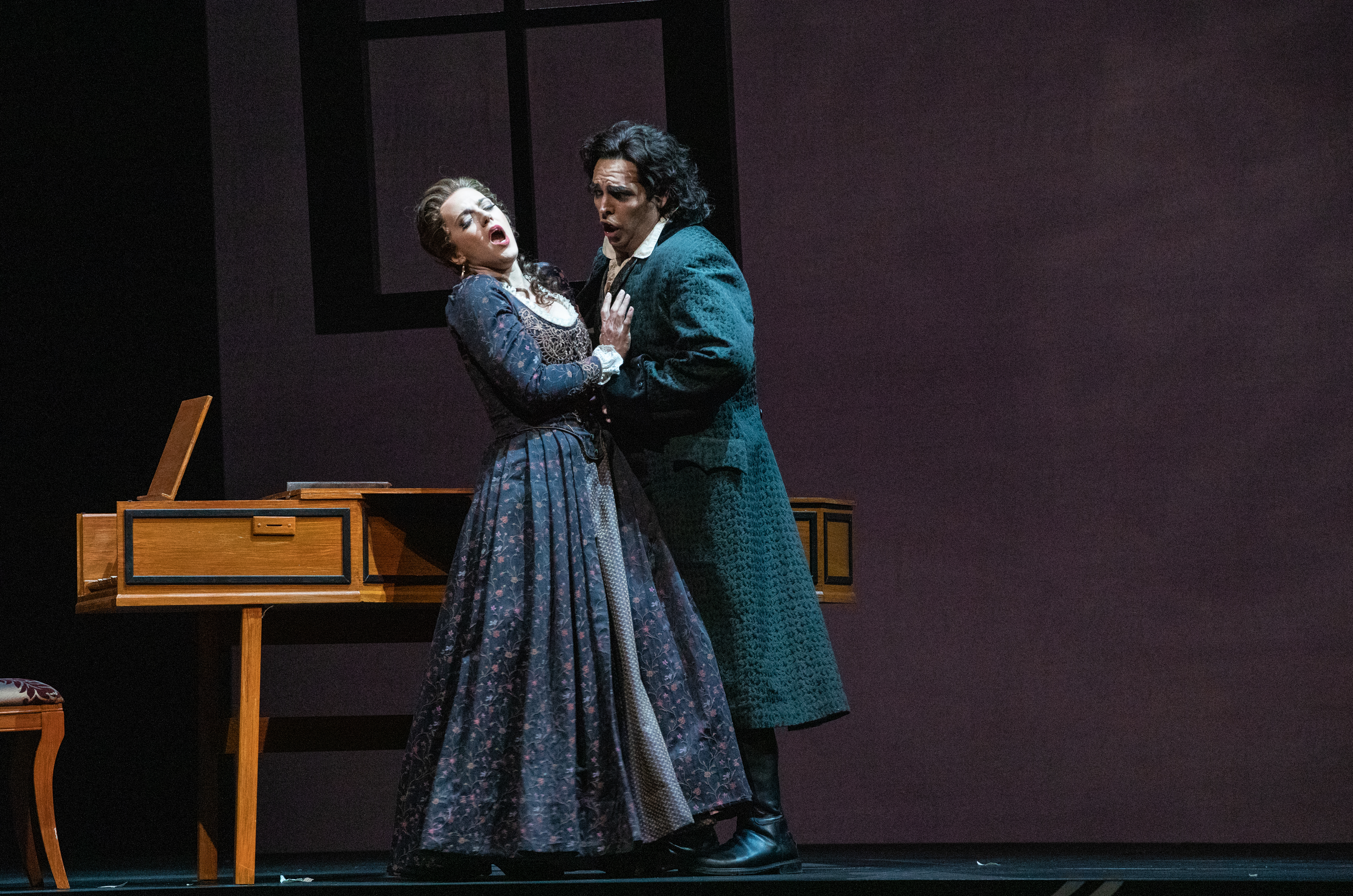
Scene from a 2019 Florida Grand Opera production

A well-regarded recording of the complete opera was made in January 1931 by French Columbia with a French cast, led by Georges Thill and Ninon Vallin, with the orchestra and chorus of the Opéra-Comique under the direction of Élie Cohen. This was later released in a 2-CD set by EMI in its References series. Alan Blyth of the Gramophone magazine commented in his 1990 review, "If you want to hear just how thoroughly prepared, technically secure, idiomatic and deeply felt French singing could be between the wars, you need only listen to this wonderful performance, now brought to new life on an excellent EMI transfer to CD." Henry Fogel of Fanfare magazine, writing in 1992, counted 14 complete recordings and considered it the finest of the lot. This recording was later released by Opera d'Oro and Naxos in different transfers.

Year	Cast (Charlotte, Sophie, Werther, Albert)	Conductor, opera house and orchestra	Label	Notes
1931	Ninon Vallin, Germaine Féraldy, Georges Thill, Marcel Roque	Élie Cohen; Orchestra and Chorus of the Opéra-Comique	Originally French Columbia; CD: Naxos 8.110061-62, Opera d'Oro OPD 1366	
1934	Gianna Pederzini, Marisa Merlo, Tito Schipa, Piero Biasini	Franco Ghione Orchestra e Coro del Teatro alla Scala di Milano	Edizioni Timaclub 1983	in Italian
1952	Oralia Domínguez, Eugenia Rocabruna, Giuseppe Di Stefano, Piero Campolonghi	Guido Picco; Orchestra e Coro del Palacio de las Bellas Artes	CD: Gala; Cat: B0040V420O	In Italian
1953	Pia Tassinari, Vittoria Neviani, Ferruccio Tagliavini, Marcello Cortis	Francesco Molinari-Pradelli; Coro di Voci Bianchi, Orchestra Sinfonica di Torino	CD: Warner-Fonit; Cat: 8573 87494-2	
1953	Suzanne Juyol, Agnes Léger, Charles Richard, Roger Bourdin	Georges Sébastian; Orchestra and Chorus of the Opéra-Comique	Originally Nixa/Urania; CD: Andromeda; Cat: ANDRCD 5073	
1954	Maria Maksakova, Maria Zvezdina, Ivan Kozlovsky, Vladimir Sakharov	Onissim Bron; Moscow Radio Orchestra	CD: Myto; Cat: B000027HNO	In Russian
1959	Leyla Gencer, Giuliana Tavolaccini, Ferruccio Tagliavini, Mario Borriello	Carlo Felice Cillario; Coro di Teatro Verdi di Trieste Orchestra e Coro	CD: Opera d'Oro; Cat: 1234	In Italian
1964	Rita Gorr, Mady Mesplé, Albert Lance, Gabriel Bacquier	Jésus Etcheverry; Orchestra and Chorus of the Radiodiffusion-Télévision Française	CD: Accord; Cat: 472 917-2	
1968-69	Victoria de los Ángeles, Mady Mesplé, Nicolai Gedda, Roger Soyer	Georges Prêtre; Orchestre de Paris	CD: EMI; Cat: 562 6272	
1971	Virginia Zeani, Valeria Mariconda, Alfredo Kraus, Domenico Trimarchi	Antonino Votto; Orchestra e Coro del Teatro Massimo di Palermo	CD: G.O.P. Cat: 749-CD2	In Italian
1977	Brigitte Fassbaender, Marianne Seibel, Plácido Domingo, Hans Günther Nöcker	Jesús López Cobos; Bayerisches Staatsorchester	CD: Orfeo; Cat: B00000AFDE	
1979	Tatiana Troyanos, Christine Barbaux, Alfredo Kraus, Matteo Manuguerra	Michel Plasson; London Philharmonic Orchestra	CD: EMI; Cat: 7 49610-2	
1979	Elena Obraztsova, Arleen Auger, Plácido Domingo, Franz Grundheber	Riccardo Chailly; Cologne Radio Symphony Orchestra	CD: Deutsche Grammophon; Cat: 477 5652-1	
1980	Frederica von Stade, Isobel Buchanan, José Carreras, Thomas Allen	Sir Colin Davis; Orchestra of the Royal Opera House, Covent Garden	CD: Philips; Cat: 416 654-2	
1985	Brigitte Fassbaender, Magdaléna Hajossyová, Peter Dvorský, Hans Helm	Libor Pešek; Prague Radio Symphony Orchestra, Chorus of the Bambini di Praga (Television film directed by Petr Weigl)	CD (soundtrack): Supraphon; Cat: 11 1547-2 632; LD: Amadeo PHLK 7503; DVD: Image Entertainment	
1998	Vesselina Kasarova, Dawn Kotoski, Ramón Vargas, Christopher Schaldenbrand	Vladimir Jurowski; Deutsches Symphonie-Orchester Berlin	CD: RCA Victor; Cat: 74321 58224-2	
1998	Angela Gheorghiu, Patricia Petibon, Roberto Alagna, Thomas Hampson	Antonio Pappano; London Symphony Orchestra	CD: EMI; Cat: EMI 81849	
1999	Béatrice Uria-Monzon, Jaël Azzaretti, Marcus Haddock, René Massis	Jean-Claude Casadesus; Orchestre National de Lille	CD: Naxos; Cat: 8.660072-73	
2005	Elīna Garanča, Ileana Tonca, Marcelo Álvarez, Adrian Eröd	Philippe Jordan; Vienna State Opera (Video of a performance in March)	DVD: TDK; Cat: DVWW-OPWER	
2004	Susan Graham, Sandrine Piau, Thomas Hampson (baritone), Stéphane Degout	Michel Plasson; Orchestre National du Capitole de Toulouse (Video of a concert performance on 29 April)	DVD: Virgin Classics; Cat: 359257-9	
2010	Sophie Koch, Anne-Catherine Gillet, Jonas Kaufmann, Ludovic Tézier	Michel Plasson; Opéra National de Paris	DVD: Decca; Cat: B0014794-09	
2012	Sophie Koch, Eri Nakamura, Rolando Villazón, Audun Iversen	Antonio Pappano; Orchestra of the Royal Opera House	CD: Deutsche Grammophon; Cat: 0289 477 9340 3	
2018	Anna Stéphany, Mélissa Petit, Juan Diego Flórez, Audun Iversen	Cornelius Meister; Orchestra of the Zürich Opera House (Video of a 2017 performance)	DVD / Blu-Ray: Accentus; Cat: ACC10427 (Blu-Ray), ACC20427 (DVD)	
2024	Véronique Gens, Hélène Carpentier, Tassis Christoyannis, Thomas Dolié	György Vashegyi; Hungarian National Philharmonic Orchestra	CD: Bru Zane; Cat: BZ1056	
