= Roland Seiffarth =

German conductor

Roland Seiffarth (born 1940 in Drebach) is a German opera conductor.

He studied at the University of Music and Theatre Leipzig and was engaged in 1963 as Solo repetitor, later as Kapellmeister at the Leipzig Opera. He made his conducting debut here in 1967. He subsequently conducted around thirty works of the repertoire such as Aida, Turandot, Porgy and Bess and West Side Story and also conducted his own rehearsals at the opera house, among others La traviata, Die Fledermaus, La pietra del paragone by Gioachino Rossini. From 1978 to 2007, Seiffarth was music director and Chief conductor at the Musikalische Komödie in Leipzig. Since 2007, he has been Honorary conductor of the Orchestra of the Musikalische Komödie.

Numerous guest conducting engagements have taken him beyond Leipzig, to the Semperoper, the Berlin State Opera, the Metropol Theatre Berlin, the Staatstheater am Gärtnerplatz, and at the Staatsoperette Dresden and at the Staatsschauspiel Dresden. From 1991 to 1996, he was a permanent guest conductor at the Graz Opera and since 1996 he has been a regular guest conductor at the Bern Theatre. Seiffarth conducted numerous opera and operetta galas with international stars, was for several years the conductor of the annual benefit gala with José Carreras for the José Carreras Leukaemia Foundation and is a holder of the Kunstpreis der Stadt Leipzig. He has rendered special services to the cultivation of the stage works of Robert Stolz and Franz Lehár as well as outstanding services to young musicians by directing the Young Conductors Operetta Workshop.
