= Taking Pictures =

Taking Pictures may refer to:

- Taking Pictures (novel), short stories by Irish Author Anne Enright
- Taking Pictures (play), play by Marcus Lloyd
- Taking Pictures (album), album by Baghdad Jones
