= Hermann Einsele =

German oncologist

Hermann Christof Einsele (born 1958) is a German hematologist and oncologist and professor at the Julius Maximilians University of Würzburg.

== Life and education ==
Hermann Einsele was born in Stuttgart, the son of Ruth and Gerhard Einsele. After graduating from high school, he studied medicine in Tübingen, Manchester and London and graduated in 1984 with the medical state examination.

During his time as an assistant physician at the University Hospital of Tübingen, he undertook research at the Max Planck Institute of Biochemistry in Martinsried and at the Fred Hutchinson Cancer Research Center in Seattle, United States. In 1986 he received his doctor’s degree on the subject of "Investigation of peroxidative reactions in erythrocytes". His habilitation followed in 1992.

In 1999, Einsele was appointed associate professor. In 2004, he succeeded Klaus Wilms as Director of the Medical Clinic and Polyclinic II of the University Hospital Würzburg and has since held the Chair of Internal Medicine II at Julius-Maximilians-University of Würzburg. In 2014 he was elected to the Academy of Science and Literature Mainz. From 2015 to 2021, Einsele was one of the five vice presidents of the University of Würzburg.

== Scientific work ==
Einsele is considered one of the world’s leading experts in the field of multiple myeloma, cellular immunotherapy (CAR T cells, bispecific antibodies) and invasive aspergillosis in hematological and oncological patients.

His research is funded by the German Research Foundation, the EU funding programs, the EU Commission (EU FP5, EU FP6, EU FP7, EU Horizon Europe), the German Cancer Aid, the German José Carreras Leukemia Foundation, the National Institutes of Health, and the Wilhelm Sander Foundation, among others.

In 2003 he received the Van Bekkum Award of the European Group for Blood and Marrow Transplantation, the highest annual European award for research in the field of stem cell transplantation. In 2013, the “Wilhelm Sander Therapy Unit Multiple Myeloma” was founded at the University Hospital of Würzburg, which is funded by the Wilhelm Sander Foundation and headed by Einsele together with Stefan Knop.

For the period from January 1, 2020, to December 31, 2021, Einsele was elected Chairman of the German Society for Hematology and Oncology (DGHO).

== Memberships ==
- Board of Trustees of the Wilhelm Sander Foundation
- Scientific Advisory Board of the German Medical Association
- Head of the German Study Group Multiple Myeloma (DSMM)
- Medical Advisory Board of Multiple Myeloma Self-Help Austria
- Member of the Board of Directors of the Interdisciplinary Center for Clinical Research Würzburg, Germany
- Member of the Research Center for Infectious Diseases at Julius-Maximilians-Universität Würzburg, Germany
- 2023 Member of the Academia Europaea.
- Since 2020 Councilor, Board of the European Hematology Association (EHA), Amsterdam, Netherlands
- Since 2014 Member of the Academy of Science and Literature, Mainz, Germany
- 2014 - 2021 Member of the Grants Committee for clinical studies of the Deutsche Forschungsgemeinschaft DFG, Bonn, Germany
- 2014 - 2020 ERC Grant Reviewer (Consolidator/Advanced Grants), Brussels, Belgium
- 2012 - 2021 Advisory Board Member in the funding program “Zwanzig20 - Partnership for Innovation”, Federal Ministry of Education and Research (BMBF)
- 2011 Honorary Fellow of the Royal College of Pathologists, London, UK

== Research activities ==
- Since 2023 Speaker, National Center for Tumor Diseases – NCT WERA, Research and Technology (BMBF)
- Since 2023 Principal Investigator, European Commission, Horizon Europe Framework Program, “ELMUMY – Elucidation of risk factors and health determinants associated with progression of monoclonal gammopathies to multiple myeloma”
- 2023 Organization of the ESH European School of Haematology “4th How to Diagnose and Treat Multiple Myeloma”, Berlin, Germany
- Since 2022 Chairman of the German Society of Hematology and Oncology (DGHO)
- Since 2021 Co-coordinator, DFG CRC/TRR 338 “LETSIMMUN – Lymphocyte Engineering for Therapeutic Synthetic Immunity”
- Since 2021 Principal Investigator, DFG Clinical Research Group 5001 "Peripheral mechanisms of pain and its resolution"
- 2021 Organization of the ESH European School of Haematology “3rd How to Diagnose and Treat Multiple Myeloma”, virtual
- Since 2020 Chair of the Scientific Advisory Board, Wilhelm Sander Foundation, Munich, Germany
- Since 2018 Co-Coordinator, DFG CRC/ TRR 221: “Modulation of graft-versus-host and graft-versus-leukemia immune responses after allogeneic stem cell transplantation”, Project A03
- Since 2015 Principal Investigator, DFG CRC/ TRR 124: “Pathogenic Fungi and their Human Host: Networks of Interaction – FungiNet”, Project A2 / Project A8
