= Isobel Buchanan =

Scottish operatic soprano (born 1954)

Isobel Buchanan (born 15 March 1954) is a Scottish operatic soprano.

== Early life and career ==
Isobel Buchanan was born in 1954 in Glasgow, Scotland. In 1971, aged 17, she received a scholarship to the Royal Scottish Academy of Music and Drama, where in 1974, she was awarded with Student of the Year prize. She also won the Governor's Recital Prize that same year.

She signed a three-year contract with The Australian Opera in 1975 to pursue her career in singing. The next year, she made her professional operatic debut as Pamina in the company's production of The Magic Flute. She was the youngest Principal Artist in the company's history.

In 1978 she again played Pamina in a new production by John Cox at Glyndebourne Festival Opera. (She returned to Glyndebourne in 1981 as Countess Almaviva in Mozart's The Marriage of Figaro and reprised the role at the 1984 Festival.)

In 1978, she sang Micaela in Carmen at the Vienna State Opera, conducted by Carlos Kleiber with Plácido Domingo as Don José and Elena Obraztsova as Carmen, in a production by Franco Zeffirelli. (She had sung Michaela in Sydney.) She continued adding to her repertoire with Sophie in Massenet's Werther and a Flower Maiden in Wagner's Parsifal at the Royal Opera House in 1979.

Since then, she has appeared at the Lyric Opera of Chicago, Scottish Opera, Bavarian State Opera, Opéra National de Paris, Hamburg State Opera, Opéra de Monte-Carlo, and the Cologne Opera. She has collaborated with conductors Georg Solti, Bernard Haitink, Andrew Davis, Colin Davis, Sergiu Celibidache, John Pritchard, Neville Marriner, Carlos Kleiber and Yehudi Menuhin.

The BBC made a documentary of her career in 1981. She featured in three-part series called Isobel which was recorded in August 1983 and aired on BBC the following April. In 1983 she played Diana in the BBC television production of Orpheus in the Underworld. and also appeared in TV programmes such as Face the Music and Parkinson.

In 1990, she sang at Queen Elizabeth the Queen Mother's 90th Birthday celebration at the London Palladium in a section dedicated to Scotland. She sang "My Ain Folk" and appeared with Her Majesty's PM John Spoore and actress Geraldine McEwan with a reading of recollections of childhood in Glamis.

== Family ==
She is married to the Australian-born English stage actor Jonathan Hyde. They have two daughters; one of them is a British actress, Georgia King.

== Repertoire ==
Her repertory includes:

Year	Composer	Opera	Role(s)
1973	Puccini	Suor Angelica	Sister Genovieffa
1976	Delibes	Lakmé	Ellen
	Mozart	The Magic Flute	Pamina
	Puccini	La bohème	Mimi
	Mozart	Così fan tutte	Dorabella
1978	Bizet	Carmen	Micaëla
1979	Verdi	Simon Boccanegra	Maria Boccanegra
	Massenet	Werther	Sophie
	Wagner	Parsifal	Flower Maiden
1980	Bellini	La sonnambula	Lisa
1981	Mozart	The Marriage of Figaro	Countess Almaviva
1982	Mozart	Don Giovanni	Donna Elvira
1984	Poulenc	Dialogues of the Carmelites	Blanche de la Force

== Recordings ==
- Bizet: Carmen (Elena Obraztsova, Plácido Domingo, Isobel Buchanan, Wiener Staatsoper orchestra and chorus, Carlos Kleiber) DVD TDK 8 24121 00097 4
- Bellini: La sonnambula (Joan Sutherland, Luciano Pavarotti, Nicolai Ghiaurov, Isobel Buchanan, Della Jones, National Philharmonic Orchestra, London Opera Chorus, Richard Bonynge) CD Decca 2LH417-424
- Delibes: Lakmé (Joan Sutherland, Isobel Buchanan, Huguette Tourangeau, Henri Wilden, John Pringle, Elizabeth Sydney Orchestra, Australian Opera Chorus, Richard Bonynge) DVD Kultur Video 32031 00389
- Massenet: Werther (José Carreras, Frederica von Stade, Isobel Buchanan, Thomas Allen, Robert Lloyd, Orchestra of the Royal Opera House, Covent Garden, Colin Davis) CD Philips 00289 475 7567
- Puccini: Suor Angelica (Joan Sutherland, Christa Ludwig, Anne Collins, Isobel Buchanan, National Philharmonic Orchestra, Richard Bonynge) CD Decca 458218

== See also ==
- Massenet: Werther (Colin Davis recording)
