= Stefan Klingele =

German conductor (music)

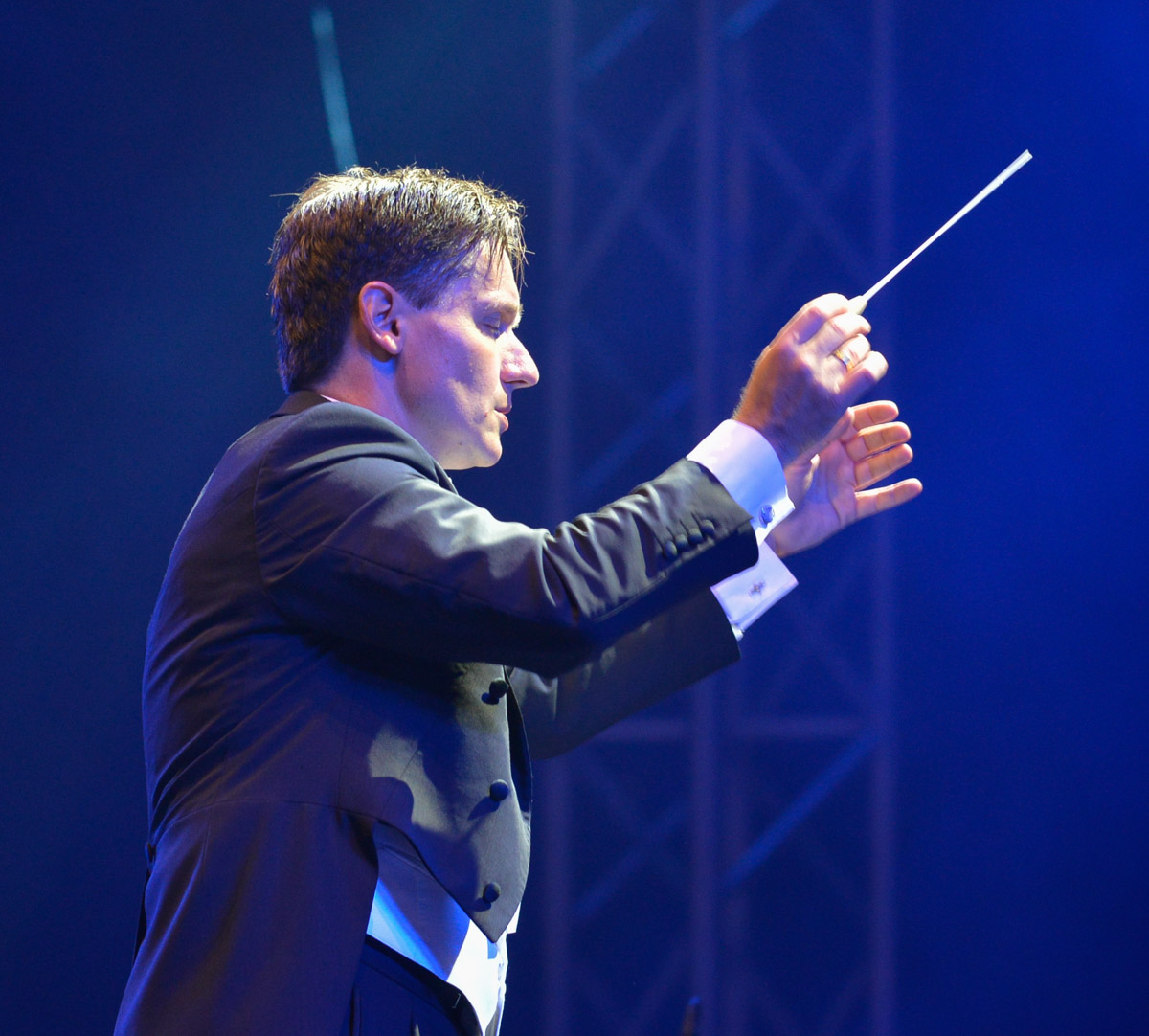
Stefan Klingele beim Kulturfestival in Stockholm, 2014

Stefan Klingele (born 30 August 1967) is a German conductor. He has been music director and chief conductor of the Musikalische Komödie in Leipzig since 2015.

== Life ==
Born in Ingolstadt, Klingele began as a répétiteur with conducting duties at the Nationaltheater Mannheim (1993-1996), moved to the Staatstheater am Gärtnerplatz Munich (1996-1999) as conductor/correpétiteur and finally to the Bremer Theater (1999-2007) as First Kapellmeister. There he conducted the German premiere of the original version of Bohuslav Martinů's The Greek Passion and the world premieres of The Autumn of the Patriarch (Giorgio Battistelli, 2004) and Inferno (Johannes Kalitzke, 2005) and devoted himself to other contemporary operas such as Solaris (Michael Obst, 2003; premiere 1996).

In his last season, Klingele was chief conductor of the Bremen Opera, which was voted in the critics' poll of the Opernwelt magazine for the 2006/07 season.

Since the Bremen engagement, Klingele has appeared as a guest on European stages, including

- the Royal Swedish Opera: Così fan tutte, Le nozze di Figaro, Eugene Onegin, Die Zauberflöte, Die Fledermaus
- die Semperoper Dresden: Madama Butterfly, Die Entführung aus dem Serail, Die Zauberflöte, Capriccio
- the Volksoper Wien: Madama Butterfly, Il tabarro/Gianni Schicchi
- the Staatsoper Stuttgart: Tosca, Salome, Il trovatore, Fidelio
- the Staatsoper Hannover: The Bassarids, Intolleranza 1960, Die Teufel von Loudun
- the Deutsche Oper am Rhein: Tosca, Carmen, Tiefland, Der Zigeunerbaron, Salome.

The production of Intolleranza 1960 at the Hanover State Opera under his musical direction was awarded the "Der Faust" for the best musical theatre direction of the season 2010/11 (director Benedikt von Peter).

In concert, Klingele has conducted the Royal Court Orchestra Stockholm, the Nuremberg Philharmonic, the Bavarian State Orchestra, the Hanover State Orchestra, the Duisburg Philharmonic, the Wuppertal Symphony Orchestra, the Kassel State Orchestra, the Lower Rhine Symphony Orchestra, the Orchestra di Padova e del Veneto, the Bremen Philharmonic and the Orchestra of the Slovenian National Theatre.

Since the 2015/16 season, Klingele has been music director and chief conductor of the Musikalische Komödie in Leipzig. There he studied, among other things Wiener Blut, Hape Kerkeling's Kein Pardon – Das Musical, On the Town and Madame Pompadour.

== Awards ==
- Bayerischer Kunstförderpreis 1999
- Kurt-Hübner-Preis 2006
