= Mélissa Petit =

French operatic soprano (born 1990)

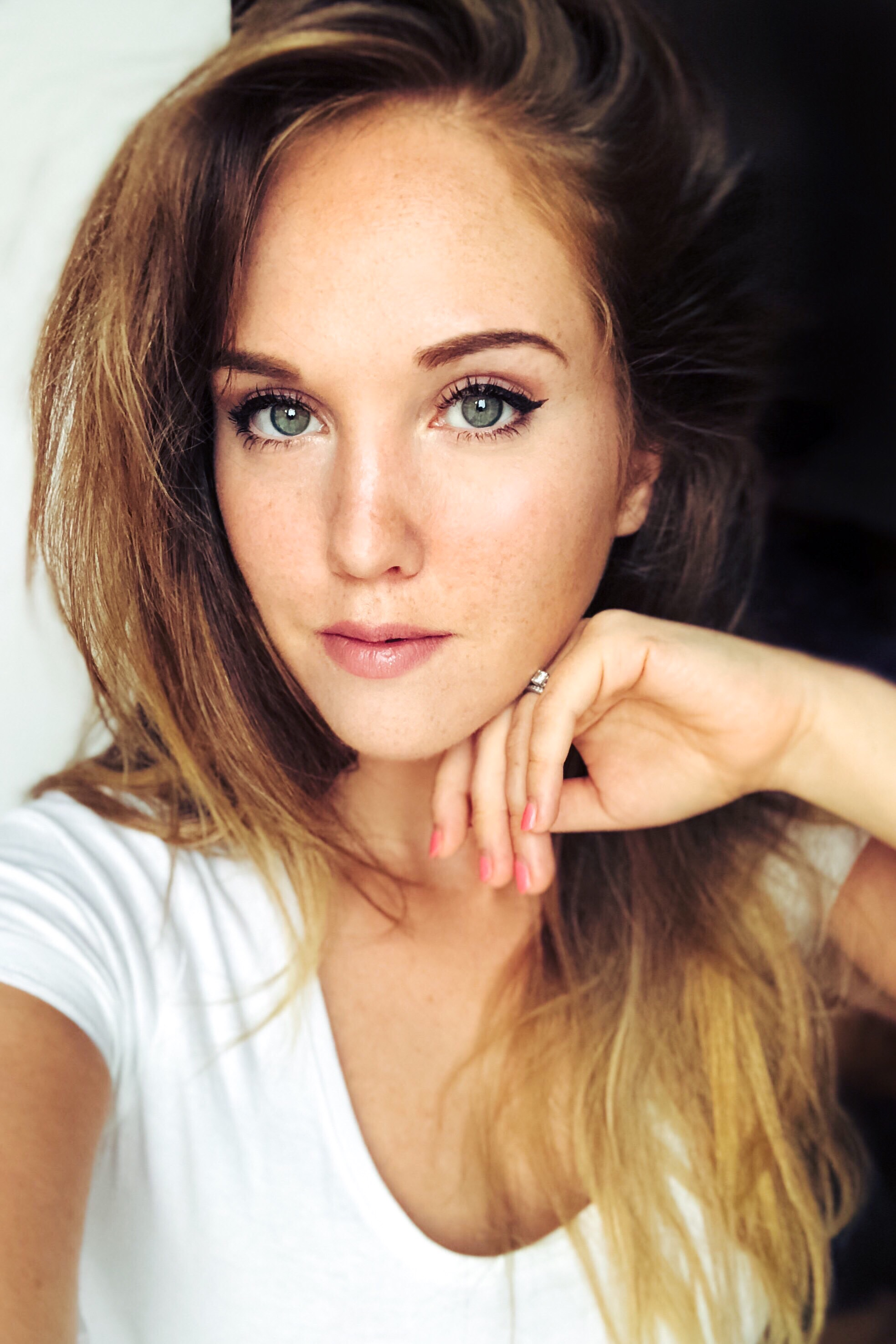
Mélissa Petit (2018)

Mélissa Petit (born 15 February 1990) is a French operatic soprano who studied piano and voice in her home town of St Raphael and in Nice. In 2009 she won second prize at the Concorso Musica Sacra in Rome and first prize at the Concours de Chant Lyrique in Béziers. She went on to spend three years with the opera studio attached to the Hamburg State Opera. After an engagement with the Zurich Opera, in 2017 she began freelancing, appearing in Bregenz, Copenhagen, Paris, Beijing, Salzburg and Lucerne. Roles have included Micaëla in Bizet's Carmen, Marzelline in Beethoven's Fidelio, and Servilia in a concert performance of Mozart's La clemenza di Tito.

== Early life ==
Born in St Raphaël in the south of France, Mélissa Petit studied piano and voice at the conservatory in her home town where she was a pupil of Fabienne Chanoyan until she was 19. She completed her studies at the Université Sophia-Antipolis in Nice. In 2009 she won second prize at the Concorso Musica Sacra in Rome and first prize at the Concours de Chant Lyrique in Béziers.

== Career ==
From 2010 to 2013, Petit gained experience as a performer in Germany and Austria while with the opera studio of the Hamburg Opera. At the 2011 Innsbruck Festival of Early Music, she appeared as Regimbert/Lombardischer Schutzgeist in Georg Philipp Telemann's Flavius Bertaridus, König der Longobarden. Representing the Hamburg Opera in the Stella Maria Singing Competition on the cruise ship MS Europa 2, she received a contract to appear in concerts at the Musikverein in Vienna.

Petit sang Edilia in Handel's opera Almira in 2014 both at the Hamburg Opera and at the Innsbruck Festival of Early Music. Other roles in Hamburg included Sister Constance in Francis Poulenc's Dialogues des Carmélites, Juliette in Erich Wolfgang Korngold's Die tote Stadt, Barbarina in Mozart's Le nozze di Figaro and the title role in Johann Mattheson's Die unglückselige Kleopatra. In 2015, she made her debut in Paris singing Giannetta in Donizetti's L’Elisir d’amore at the Opéra Bastille.

While with the Zurich Opera (2015–2017), her roles included the First Lady in Mozart's Die Zauberflöte, Ännchen in Carl Maria von Weber's Der Freischütz, Créuse in Marc-Antoine Charpentier's Médée and Marselline in Fidelio. Later roles have included Juliette in Gounod's Roméo et Juliette (Beijing, 2018), Gilda in Verdi's Rigoletto (Bregenz, 2019), and Margeurite in Arthur Honegger's Jeanne d'Arc au bûcher (Salzburg Summer Festival, 2022). At the 2023 Salzburg Festival, she sang Euridice in Glück's Orfeo ed Euridice.

== Awards ==
- 2009: second prize at the Concorso Musica Sacra in Rome
- 2009: first prize at the Concours de Chant Lyrique in Béziers
- 2012: first prize and the Prix de l’opéra de Bordeaux, Musiques au Coeur du Médoc in Bordeaux
- 2013: third prize at the Queen Sonja International Music Competition in Oslo
- 2019: third prize the Paris Opera Competition
