= La clemenza di Tito (Colin Davis recording) =

- Philips LP: 6703 079

Studio album by Colin Davis
- Released: 1977
- Genre: Opera
- Length: 127:44
- Language: Italian
- Label: Philips

La clemenza di Tito
- Philips Mozart Edition CD: 422 544-2

La clemenza di Tito is a 127-minute studio album of the opera by Wolfgang Amadeus Mozart, performed by Dame Janet Baker, Stuart Burrows, Robert Lloyd. Yvonne Minton, Lucia Popp and Frederica von Stade with the Chorus and Orchestra of the Royal Opera House, Covent Garden, under the direction of Sir Colin Davis. It was released in 1977.

== Background ==
The album was taped a few years after theatrical performances of La clemenza di Tito at Covent Garden in which Baker, Burrows, Lloyd and Minton sang the same roles as they do on the recording, and in which Davis was also the conductor. The staging, first seen in 1973, was produced by Antony Besch and designed by John Stoddart.

The album does not present an entirely complete version of the opera, several passages of recitativo secco being omitted. The Covent Garden orchestra plays with modern instruments rather than the kind that were used in Mozart's own era.

== Recording ==
The album was recorded using analogue technology in July 1976 at an unspecified location in London.

== Packaging ==
The cover of the first CD issue of the album is the work of Akamori Ralf Krieger.

== Critical reception ==
=== Reviews ===
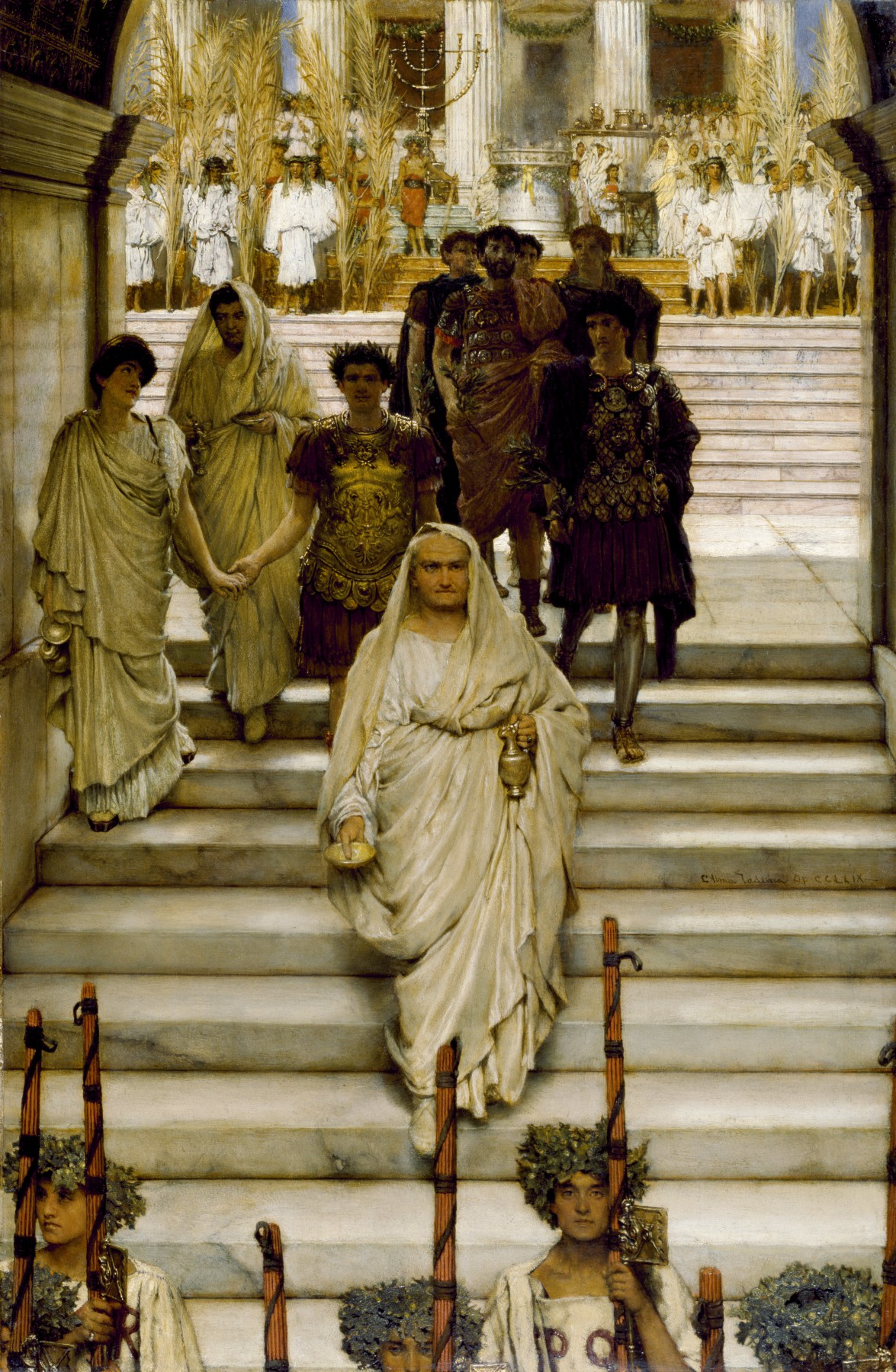
The Emperor Titus Vespasianus imagined by Sir Lawrence Alma-Tadema in 1885

The musicologist Stanley Sadie reviewed the album on LP in Gramophone in November 1977. Philips's casting of Dame Janet Baker and Yvonne Minton had given the recording "immense strength and dramatic vitality at its centre", he wrote. As Vitellia, the bitter daughter of a deposed emperor trying to manipulate her lover into murdering her father's successor, Baker was by turns subtle or domineering as the moment required. She sang with a "marvellous firmness and evenness of tone and steadiness of line", falling into imperfection only when Mozart took her higher up the stave than she was comfortable with. In the castrato role of Sesto, the infatuated instrument of Vitellia's scheming, Yvonne Minton delivered a performance that was arguably more impressive still. She was equally successful at portraying both sides of Sesto's character: the youth besotted with his vengeful mistress, and the "Roman of the highest standards of honour, courage and resolve" torn by the competing claims of duty and desire. And as well as singing with "real dramatic power", Minton displayed "virtuosity of a high order". "Pure", "superb" and "magnificent" were just some of the accolades that Sadie bestowed on her vocalism, although he acknowledged that sometimes. like Baker, she perpetrated an imperfect note which should have been mended by a retake. Stuart Burrows was scarcely less good as the third of the opera's principals, "a strong Tito, lyrical when he [was] being gentle and merciful, yet with a force ... in the more imperial music that [made] him a plausible figure as a Roman emperor." Frederica von Stade did splendidly in another Mozart en travesti role to set beside her Cherubino, singing Annio with force and true rhetorical power in the scene where the young man advised Sesto to throw himself on Tito's mercy. In the other secondary roles, Lucia Popp was affecting as an argent-bright Servilia and Robert Lloyd was "properly sturdy" as the Praetorian soldier, Publio. Covent Garden's orchestra played splendidly, with the opera's famous clarinet and basset-horn obbligatos both dispatched with distinction. Conducting, Davis infused the album with all the energy of a live performance, eliciting "taut rhythms, firm accents [and] a general urgency". It was obvious that Davis, his orchestra and several of his soloists had profited greatly having presented Tito at Covent Garden. Well recorded and well balanced, the album was certainly the best version of the opera yet committed to disc.

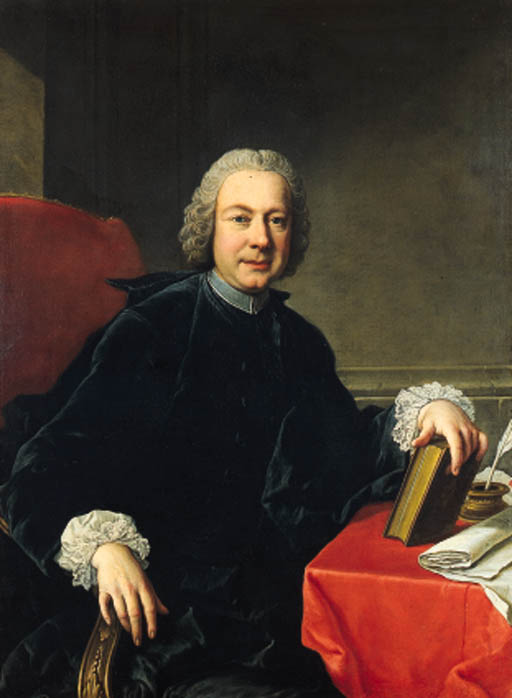
Pietro Metastasio, in a portrait attributed to Batoni

Eric Salzman reviewed the album on LP in Stereo Review in May 1978. Janet Baker, he wrote, sang with "a good deal of passion - a quality not always associated with her beautiful and sometimes remote vocal sound - as Vitellia". Stuart Burrows's Tito was "strong", Lucia Popp's Servilia "stunning", Yvonne Minton's Sesto "ably interpreted" and Frederica von Stade's Annio "quite adorable" despite "a tight little vibrato". The orchestra's playing was "excellent", and Colin Davis's conducting "strong" too. This was not to say that the album had no weaknesses. Firstly, the presence of three mezzo-sopranos in its dramatis personae made for a degree of monotony. Secondly, none of the singers had interpolated appoggiaturas and other ornaments in the way that Mozart would have expected them to. Thirdly, the opera itself had its negatives. Although its music was brisk, concise, emphatic and full of feeling, its characters were cardboard and its story chilly and dull. But all in all, the album was "superb both in performance and recording", and one that certainly deserved to be heard.

J. B. Steane reviewed the album on LP in Gramophone in January 1980, comparing it with a more recent version of the opera conducted by Karl Böhm. Both recordings had points in their favour, he thought. In one of Vitellia's arias, for example, Janet Baker's "noble anger" was preferable to the "shrewish huff" of Böhm's Julia Varady, while in another, Baker's superior technique was countered by Varady's greater delicacy and eloquence. In a duet for Annio and Sesto, Frederica von Stade and Yvonne Minton sang with more "charm and lightness" than Böhm's Marga Schiml and Teresa Berganza. And as Tito, Stuart Burrows was "more agreeable to listen to" than Böhm's Peter Schreier. On the other hand, Böhm himself sometimes conducted better than Davis, delivering a livelier Overture and a statelier March and allowing Tito more time to meditate in his dark night of the soul.

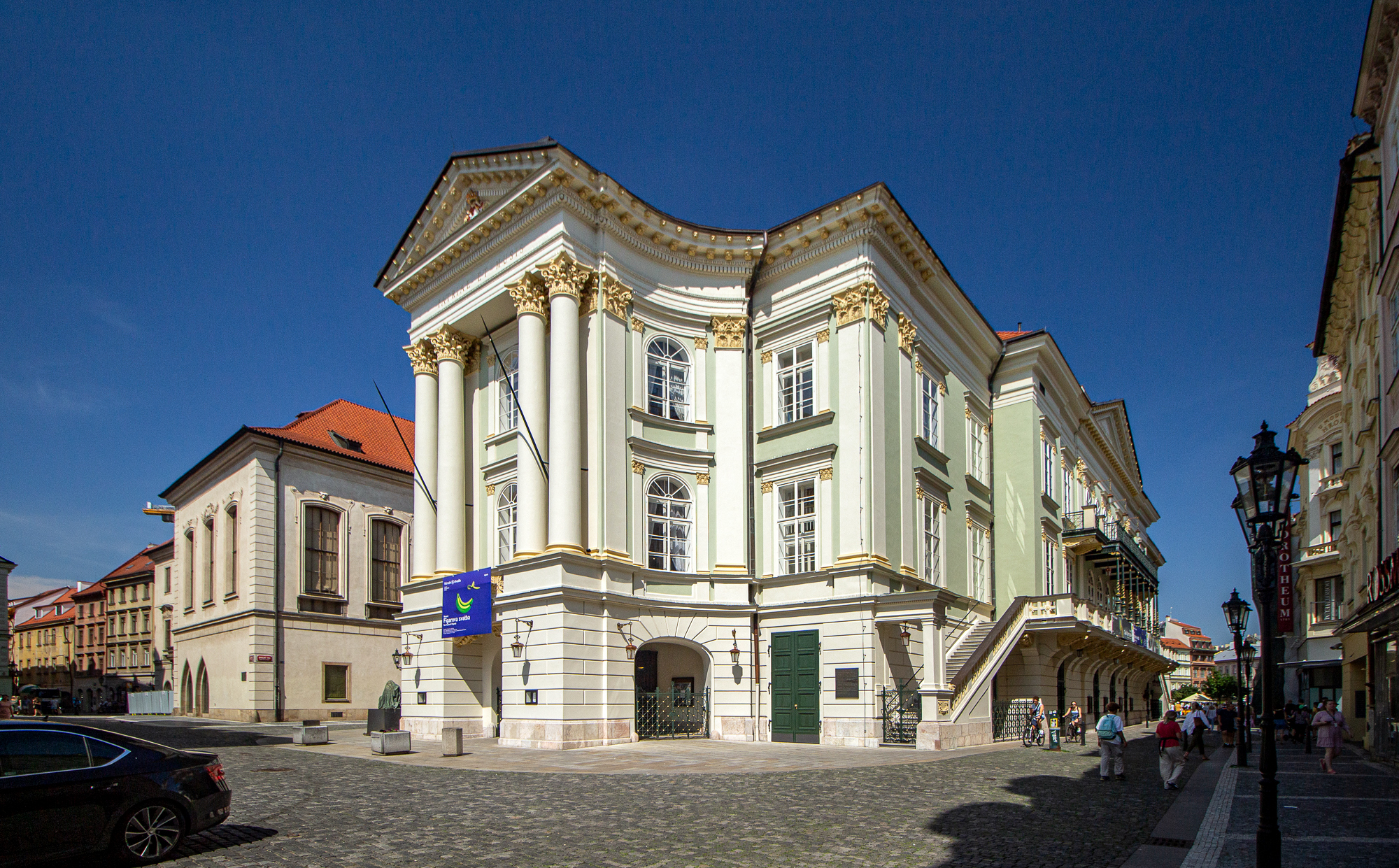
The Estates Theatre in Prague, where La clemenza di Tito was premiered

Hilary Finch reviewed the album on CD in Gramophone in September 1987. She conceded that La clemenza di Tito had a rebarbative reputation, but suggested that Davis's recording could win some converts to its cause. She judged Janet Baker's Vitellia to be good with reservations. Vocally, Baker showed signs of her advancing years in both her higher notes and her lower. Dramatically, she offered more sternness and less glitter than some people might wish. But she painted a compelling portrait of her character with no little psychological acuity. As Sesto, Yvonne Minton was in no way Baker's inferior, delivering a "truly great portrayal" with "dignity and power" and a voice still strong at the bottom of the stave. Lucia Popp and Frederica von Stade made something "delightful" out of their love duet. The only soloist who was disappointing was Stuart Burrows as the emperor. He supplied a photograph of Tito, as it were, when what was needed was a movie. He "never quite [touched] the greatness of voice and of heart demanded by the role", although the orchestra revealed much about the emperor that he was unable to show us. The hallmark of the album as a whole was its kinetic energy, exemplified by the five minutes of "electrifying" recitative (accompanied by an excellent harpsichordist) at its very beginning. Its vitality was chiefly attributable to Colin Davis's conducting. "Throughout it is his excitement and admiration for the score which is palpably transferred to the listener."

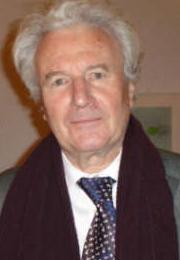
Sir Colin Davis in 2007

Alan Blyth reviewed the album on CD in Gramophone in April 1992. He admitted that Janet Baker's voice bleached when it climbed into the ledger lines, but he applauded her for her "splendidly vicious, calculating and alluring Vitellia". He thought that Yvonne Minton's Sesto had set the gold standard for the part - "a handsome, authoritative performance, creamy and firm in tone, secure in character". He did not share Finch's poor opinion of Stuart Burrows's contribution, acclaiming Burrows's Mozartian musicianship and arguing that he made Tito's acts of forgiveness easy to believe in. Lucia Popp and Frederica von Stade had happily been cast when "both in their absolute prime". He shared Finch's perception that Colin Davis patently loved Mozart's score.

Richard Wigmore discussed the album in a survey of the La clemenza de Tito discography in Gramophone in October 2010. He too noticed that Janet Baker's voice deteriorated above the stave, but this mattered little when set against her achievement as a singing actress in bringing Vitellia to life. She was "probably the most vicious, obsessively driven Vitellia on disc", until, after her epiphany of repentance, she sang her rondo of remorse "with an intense, traumatized inwardness and nobility of line". Her only failing was her inability to convey Vitellia's sexual magnetism. Yvonne Minton sang her Sesto attractively, intelligently and eloquently, although not always with an entirely perfect technique. Wigmore's assessment of Stuart Burrows's Tito was equivocal. Burrows had the right timbre for the part, with a "hint of metal in the velvet", and his well-schooled virtuosity made for praiseworthy phrasing and meticulously accurate coloratura. But his Tito did not adequately express the grief and doubt that tormented the emperor after Sesto had betrayed him. In the secondary roles, Lucia Popp was "enchanting", Frederica von Stade "urgent and plangent" and the "oaken-voiced" Robert Lloyd the best Publio on disc.

=== Accolades ===
In May 1978, Stereo Review included the album in its "Best Recordings of the Month" pages.

Discussing the album in his Gramophone survey in October 2010, Richard Wigmore concluded that it was the finest of all the recordings of the opera that had been performed with modern instruments. "Baker's vicious Vitellia attains a tragic gravitas in her final scene," he wrote, "while Yvonne Minton's intensely 'lived' Sesto vindicates Davis's broad tempi, characteristic of the elegiac tinta he brings to Mozart's score."

== Track listing, CD1 ==
Wolfgang Amadeus Mozart (1756-1791)

La clemenza di Tito, opera seria in due atti (Prague, 1791), K. 621, with a libretto by Caterino Mazzolà (1745-1806) after Pietro Metastasio (1698-1782)

- 1 (4:56) Ouverture

Act One

- 2 (2:04) Recitativo: "Ma che sempre l'istesso" (Vitellia, Sesto)
- 3 (3:03) No. 1 Duetto: "Come ti piace imponi" (Sesto, Vitellia)
- 4 (1:29) Recitativo: "Amico, il passo affretta" (Annio, Vitellia, Sesto)
- 5 (5:32) No. 2 Aria: "Deh si piacer mi vuoi... Chi ciecammente crede" (Vitellia)
- 6 (1:21) Recitativo: "Amico, ecco il momento" (Annio, Sesto)
- No. 3 Duettino: "Deh prendi un dolce amplesso" (Annio, Sesto)
- 7 (2:03) No. 4 Marcia
- 8 (6:30) No. 5 Coro: "Serbate, oh Dei custodi" (Chorus)
- Recitativo: "Tu della patria il Padre" (Publio, Annio, Tito)
- No. 5 Coro: "Serbate, oh Dei custodi" (Chorus)
- Recitativo: "Basta, basta, oh miei fidi" (Tito)
- No. 4 Marcia
- 9 (2:21) Recitativo: "Adesso, oh Sesto, parla per me" (Annio, Sesto, Tito)
- 10 (2:38) No. 6 Aria: "Del più sublime soglio" (Tito)
- 11 (1:26) Recitativo: "Non ci pentiam" (Annio, Servilia)
- 12 (3:08) No. 7 Duetto: "Ah perdona al primo affetto" (Annio, Servilia)
- 13 (1:22) Recitativo: "Servilia! Augusta!" (Tito, Servilia)
- 14 (2:15) No. 8 Aria: "Ah, se fosse intorno al trono" (Tito)
- 15 (2:32) Recitativo: "Felice me!" (Servilia, Vitellia)
- Recitativo: "Ancora mi schernisce?" (Vitellia, Sesto)
- 16 (6:21) No. 9 Aria: "Parto, ma tu ben mio... Guardami, e tutto obblio" (Sesto)
- 17 (0:45) Recitativo: "Vedrai, Tito, vedrai" (Vitellia, Publio, Annio)
- 18 (2:27) No. 10 Terzetto: "Vengo... aspettate... Sesto!" (Vitellia, Annio, Publio)
- 19 (3:57) No. 11 Recitativo accompagnato: "Oh Dei, che smania è questa" (Sesto)
- 20 (6:31) No. 12 Quintetto con Coro: "Deh conservate, oh Dei!" (Sesto, Annio, Servilia, Publio, Vitellia, Chorus)
- Recitativo: "Sesto!" (Vitellia, Sesto, Servilia, Annio, Publio, Chorus)

== Track listing, CD2 ==
Act Two

- 1 (1:18) Recitativo: "Sesto, come tu credi" (Annio, Sesto)
- 2 (2:30) No. 13 Aria: "Torna di Tito a lato" (Annio)
- 3 (1:20) Recitativo: "Partir, deggio, o restar?" (Sesto, Vitellia)
- Recitativo: "Sesto!" / "Che chiedi?" (Publio, Sesto, Vitellia)
- 4 (4:40) No. 14 Terzetto: "Se al volto mai ti senti" (Sesto, Vitellia, Publio)
- 5 (3:49) No. 15 Coro: "Ah grazie si rendano" (Chorus, Tito)
- 6 (1:01) Recitativo: "Già de' Pubblici giuochi" (Publio, Tito)
- 7 (1:40) No. 16 Aria: "Tardi s'avvede" (Publio)
- 8 (1:13) Recitativo: "No, così scellerato" (Tito, Annio, Publio)
- 9 (3:10) No. 17 Aria: "Tu fosti tradito" (Annio)
- 10 (2:51) Recitativo accompagnato: "Che orror! Che tradimento" (Tito)
- Recitativo: "Ingrato" (Tito)
- 11 (3:58) No. 18 Terzetto: "Quello di Tito è il volto!" (Sesto, Tito, Publio)
- 12 (1:29) Recitativo: "Odimi, oh Sesto; siam soli" (Tito, Sesto)
- 13 (7:04) No. 19 Aria (Rondo): "Deh per questo istante solo... Disperato vado a morte" (Sesto)
- 14 (1:03) Recitativo: "Dove s'intese mai più contumace infedeltà?" (Tito)
- 15 (5:08) No. 20 Aria: "Se all'impero" (Tito)
- 16 (1:21) Recitativo: "Non giova lusingarsi" (Vitellia, Servilia, Annio)
- 17 (2:05) No. 21 Aria: "S'altro che lagrime" (Servilia)
- 18 (2:16) No. 22 Recitativo accompagnato: "Ecco il punto, oh Vitellia" (Vitellia)
- 19 (7:35) No. 23 Rondo: "Non più di fiori... Infelice! Qual orrore!" (Vitellia)
- 20 (1:56) No. 24 Coro: "Che del ciel, che degli Dei" (Chorus)
- 21 (1:40) Recitativo: "Sesto, de' tuoi delitto" (Tito, Vitellia, Servilia, Sesto, Annio, Publio)
- 22 (1:40) No. 25 Recitativo accompagnato: "Ma che giorno è mai questo?" (Tito)
- 23 (4:13) No. 26 Sestetto con Coro: "Tu, è ver, m'assolvi, Augusto" (Sesto, Tito, Vitellia, Servilia, Annio, Publio, Chorus)

== Personnel ==
=== Performers ===
- Stuart Burrows (tenor), Tito Vespasiano, Emperor of Rome
- Dame Janet Baker (mezzo-soprano), Vitellia, daughter of the deposed Emperor Vitellio
- Yvonne Minton (mezzo-soprano), Sesto, a young patrician, friend of Tito, in love with Vitellia
- Frederica von Stade (mezzo-soprano), Annio, a young patrician, friend of Sesto, in love with Servilia
- Lucia Popp (1939-1993, soprano), Servilia, sister of Sesto, in love with Annio
- Robert Lloyd (bass), Publio, Praetorian Prefect, commander of the Praetorian Guard
- Ian Herbert, clarinet
- Frederick Lowe, basset-horn
- Charles Taylor, first violin
- John Constable, harpsichord continuo and conductor's assistant
- Chorus of the Royal Opera House, Covent Garden (chorus master: Robin Stapleton)
- Orchestra of the Royal Opera House, Covent Garden
- Sir Colin Davis, conductor

=== Other ===
- Ubaldo Gardini, Italian language coach

== Release history ==
In 1977, Philips released the album as a set of three LPs (catalogue number 6703 079) and on cassette (catalogue number 7699 038), both issues being accompanied by a booklet with notes, texts and translations.

In 1987, Philips issued the album as a double CD (catalogue number 420 097-2), packaged in a slipcase with a 180-page booklet. The booklet contained a libretto, a synopsis by Bernd J. Delfs and an essay by Ulrich Schreiber, all in English, French, German and Italian. It also included photographs of Davis and his solo singers by Mike Evans and several historical illustrations - the first page of Mozart's autograph score, the title page of an early edition of the opera, the theatre where the opera was premiered and portraits of Mozart, Metastasio and the Emperor Leopold II (for whose coronation as King of Bohemia the opera was commissioned).

In 1992, the album was issued on CD in revised packaging (catalogue number 422 544-2PME2) as part of Philips's edition of Mozart's complete works.
