= Musikalische Komödie =

German theatre venue

Coordinates: 51.336168°N 12.339165°E

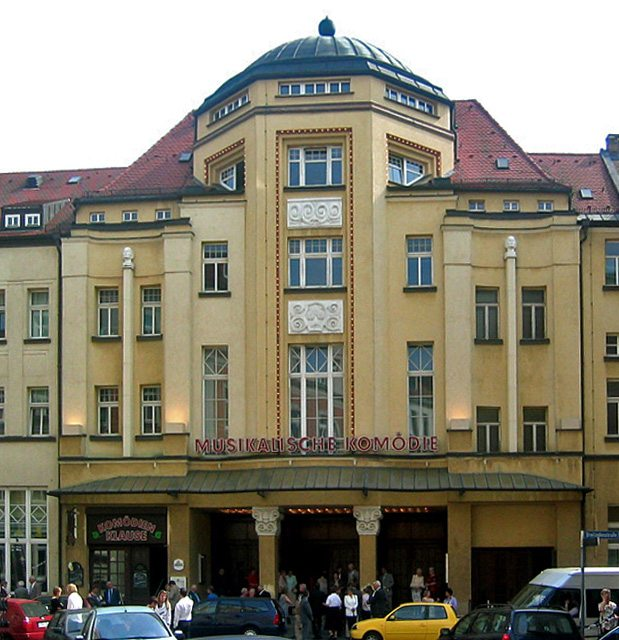
The Musikalische Komödie im Haus Dreilinden

The Musikalische Komödie (colloquially MuKo) is an operettas and musicals theatre in Leipzig. Its venue is located in the Lindenau district in the Haus Dreilinden, which is often referred to as the "Musical Comedy" itself. It is one of the three sections of the Oper Leipzig. However, it has its own ensemble with soloists, choir, ballet company and orchestra. Because of this and its own venue, it is perceived by the public as an independent cultural institution. Its repertoire ranges from Spieloper to operetta and musicals.

== History ==
=== Haus Dreilinden ===
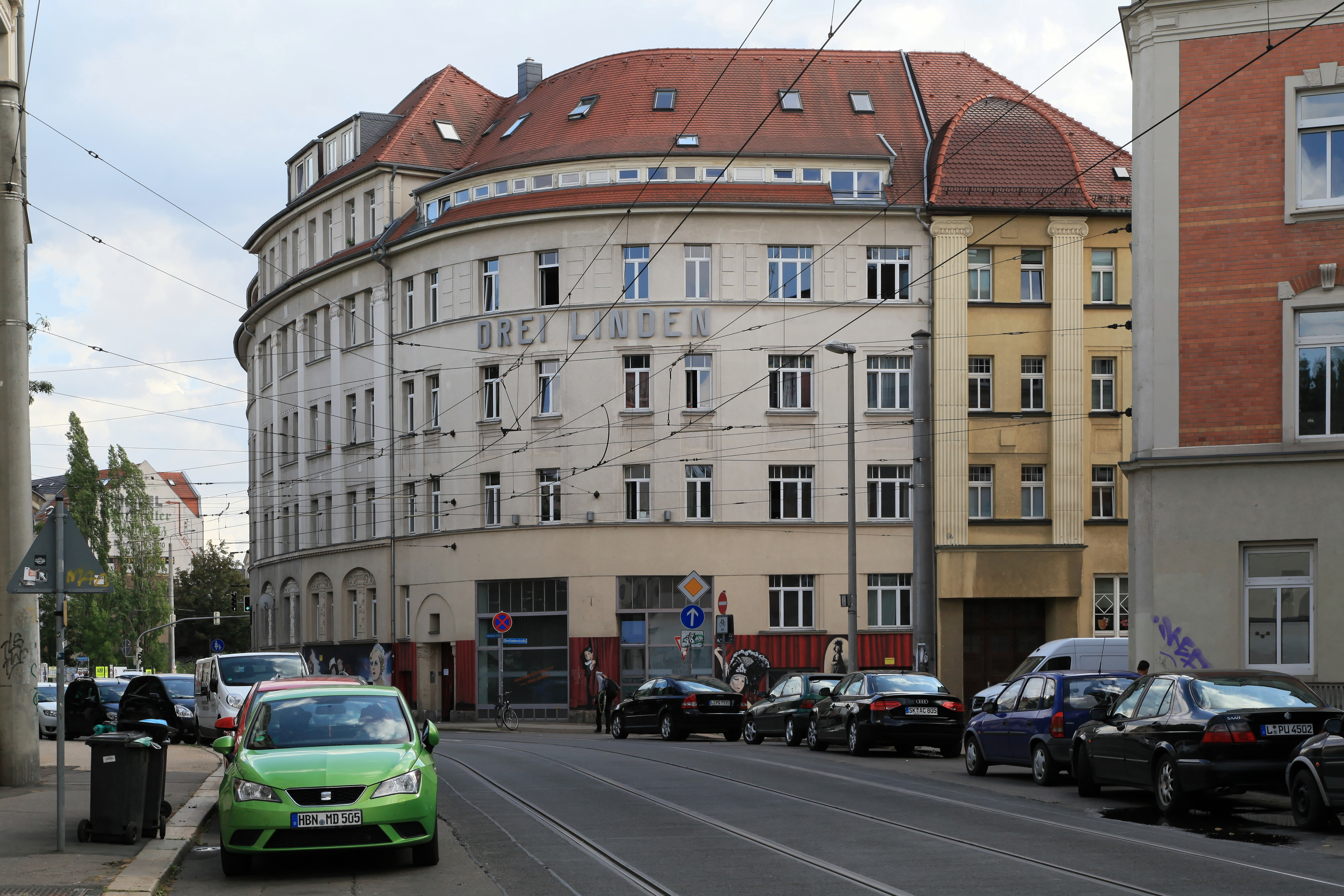
Eckhaus Zschochersche-/Dreilindenstraße

The oldest inn in Lindenau was first mentioned in 1495, roughly on the site of the present Musikalische Komödie, and from the beginning of the 18th century it was called "Drei Linden" and Napoleon Bonaparte is said to have stayed there after the Battle of Leipzig. Even before 1900, the inn had a beer garden, which was considered a popular destination for Leipzigers and where theatre was also played in the summer.

At the beginning of the 20th century, the inn was demolished and the Dreilindenstraße/Zschochersche Straße/Lützener Straße arch was built on with three-storey residential buildings. In the courtyard area of this ensemble, the C. W. Naumann Brewery built a hall in 1912 according to a design by the architect Otto Gerstenberger as a magnificent concert and ballroom with 3000 seats. The hall had a small stage and on the gallery a wine bar and a so-called Biererschwemme. It was used as the "Varieté Drei Linden" from 1913. Its entrance building, which was also equipped with gastronomy, was located in Dreilindenstraße. A conversion in 1918 was geared towards further use as a metropolitan Varieté.

Since all the theatres in the city centre had been destroyed or badly damaged by the end of the Second World War, the hall was used as an alternative venue for the Leipzig Opera from 1945 to 1960. In 1952, an attempt was made to meet the minimal requirements of an opera theatre when the building was rebuilt. With the completion of the opera house on Karl-Marx-Platz in 1960, the hall became available for the operetta theatre.

Today the house has 529 seats. Although reconstructions have been carried out in numerous areas since 1992, the galleries are not yet usable. Significant improvements for the artists, e. e.g. in the dressing rooms, have been brought about by ongoing construction measures involving a neighbouring building since 2014. In April 2018, a comprehensive refurbishment of the Musikalische Komödie was approved by Leipzig City Council. A closure of the house is planned from July 2019 to November 2020, during which time the auditorium with orchestra pit is to be thoroughly modernised. The rear galleries are to be removed and the auditorium redesigned. After the renovation, which is estimated at 7.6 million euros, the seating capacity will be 640. The Leipzig Westbad, where 480 seats will be provided, will serve as an interim during this time.

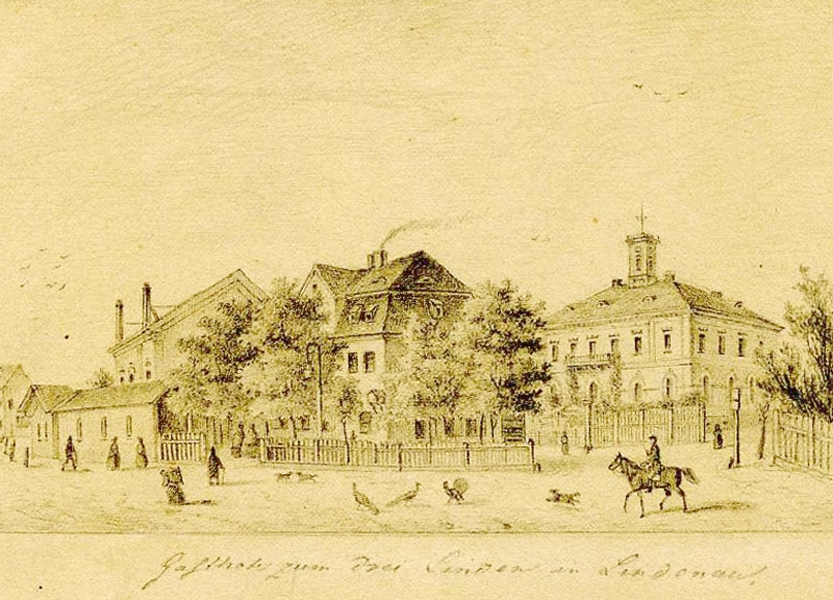
The inn Drei Linden ca. 1870

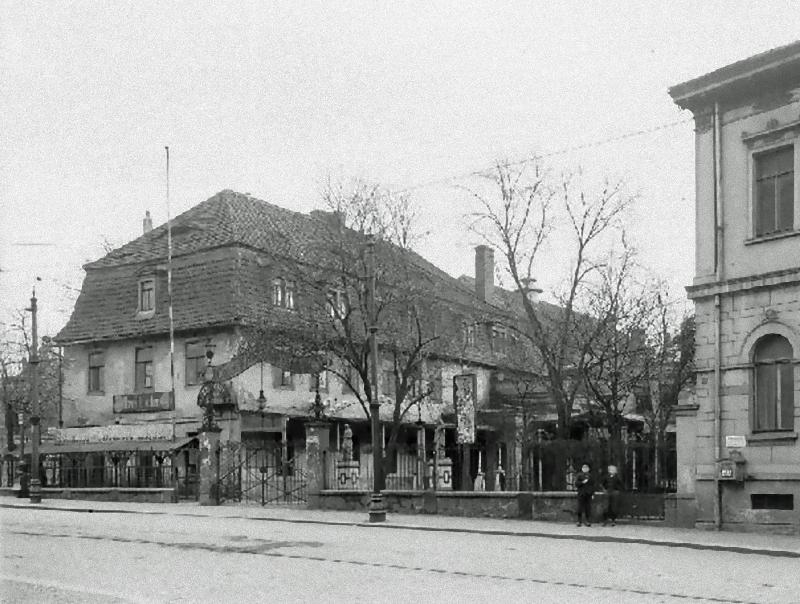
The inn Drei Linden before 1907

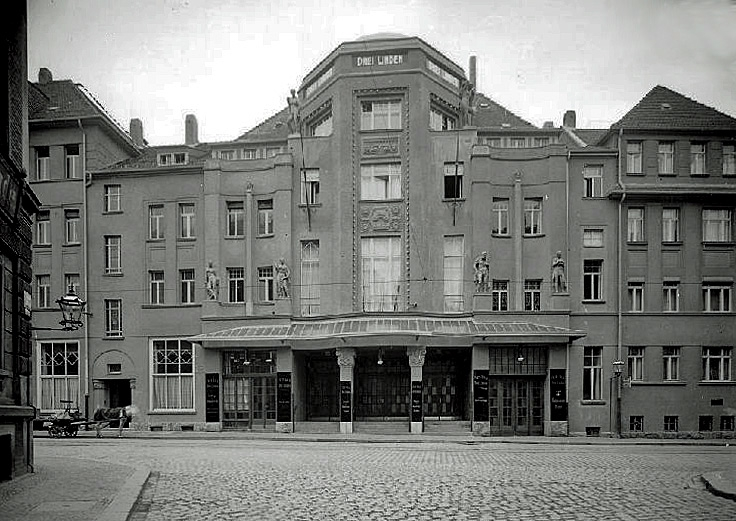
The Varieté Drei Linden ca. 1920

=== Theater ===
The history of Leipzig's operetta theatre extends beyond that of the Musikalische Komödie. In addition to the operetta performances in the Altes Theater, the "Operettentheater am Thomasring" was established in 1906 in the complex of the Schauspiel Leipzig on Thomasring (today Dittrichring), which was built in 1901/1902. In 1912, the theatre was transferred to municipal sponsorship. In the 1920s and 1930s, works by Franz Lehár, Paul Abraham, Robert Stolz, Ralph Benatzky, Paul Lincke and other masters of operetta were performed, often under the conductorship of the composers, and important performers of this genre such as Johannes Heesters appeared. The theatre operated until it was severely damaged in the Second World War.

After the war, the ensemble found temporary accommodation in a hall on Lindenauer Markt, later to become the Theaterhaus am Lindenauer Markt. With soloists, choristers, dancers and orchestral musicians, it formed the core of the second municipal music theatre that was created after the opera moved out of Haus Dreilinden in 1960. This was called "Kleines Haus Dreilinden" and was under the direction of director Erhard Fischer. Classical operetta and especially the cultivation of the works of Jacques Offenbach formed the backbone of the repertoire. Contemporary works of Heiteres Musiktheater were also cultivated in accordance with the cultural mandate, with varying degrees of success. June 1972, on 15 June 1974 Gerd Natschinski conducted the premiere of his musical Terzett, then Keep Smiling by Harry Sander and Aphrodite and the Sexual War by Gerhard Kneifel on 30 April 1976.

In 1965, Wolfgang Weit became the new artistic director and from 1968 the director of the house, which from that year onwards called itself "Musikalische Komödie". Works of various musical genres, play opera, operetta and works of the 20th century, among others Rise and Fall of the City of Mahagonny (production Joachim Herz, 1967), were performed. Now the classic Broadway musicals, such as Kiss Me, Kate, My Fair Lady and Can Can were also shown. But newer ones like Sweet Charity also made it into the programme.

In 1983, Klaus Winter took over the direction with a turn to Viennese operetta and here especially to Johann Strauss and Robert Stolz. The cultivation of Robert Stolz was the particular concern and merit of Roland Seiffarth, who had been musical director and chief conductor at the Musikalische Komödie since 1978; he also rehabilitated the operetta composer Friedrich Schröder with the performance of his opera Das Bad auf der Tenne in 1980.

After the disentanglement of the Leipzig "theatre concern" after the Peaceful Revolution of 1989 and the brief independence of the Musikalische Komödie, it became an artistically independent part of the Oper Leipzig (within the framework of a multi-part theatre) under the artistic directorship of Udo Zimmermann in 1990. The first director under this constellation was ballet master Monika Geppert.

Currently, the artistic director of the Leipzig Opera and consequently also of the Musikalische Komödie is Ulf Schirmer. The MuKo's operations director is Torsten Rose, music director and chief conductor is Stefan Klingele, and chief director is Cusch Jung. The ensemble of the Musikalische Komödie consists of 14 singers, 48 musicians of the orchestra, 25 choir members and 15 dancers.
