= Taking Pictures (short story collection) =

2008 work by Anne Enright

- First edition
- Author: Anne Enright
- Language: English
- Publisher: Jonathan Cape
- Publication date: 6 March 2008
- Publication place: Ireland
- Media type: Print (hardback & paperback)
- Pages: 226 pp (hardcover)
- ISBN: 0-224-08469-0
- OCLC: 181422232

Taking Pictures is the second collection of short stories by Irish writer Anne Enright. It was first published in 2008, a year after she won the Booker Prize, although several of the stories had previously been published or broadcast.

The Independent described the collection as often gross, but not grim - "among the ghosts and smells and screams that saturate life, there are unexpected opportunities for joy" - and noted that Enright "deals beautifully with life in the modern world".

Hermione Lee, in The Guardian, said that the stories "take unflinching, alarming pictures of the way things are in many women's lives" and praised their "laconic, savage verve" and "the lyric strangeness that keeps pushing through the disabused realism".

In September 2008, the stories from this collection and from Enright's first collection, The Portable Virgin, were repackaged into a single 31-story volume, Yesterday's Weather. This volume was described by Kirkus Reviews as "beguiling" and by Publishers Weekly as "overstuffed".
