= Flavius Bertaridus =

- Opera by Georg Philipp Telemann
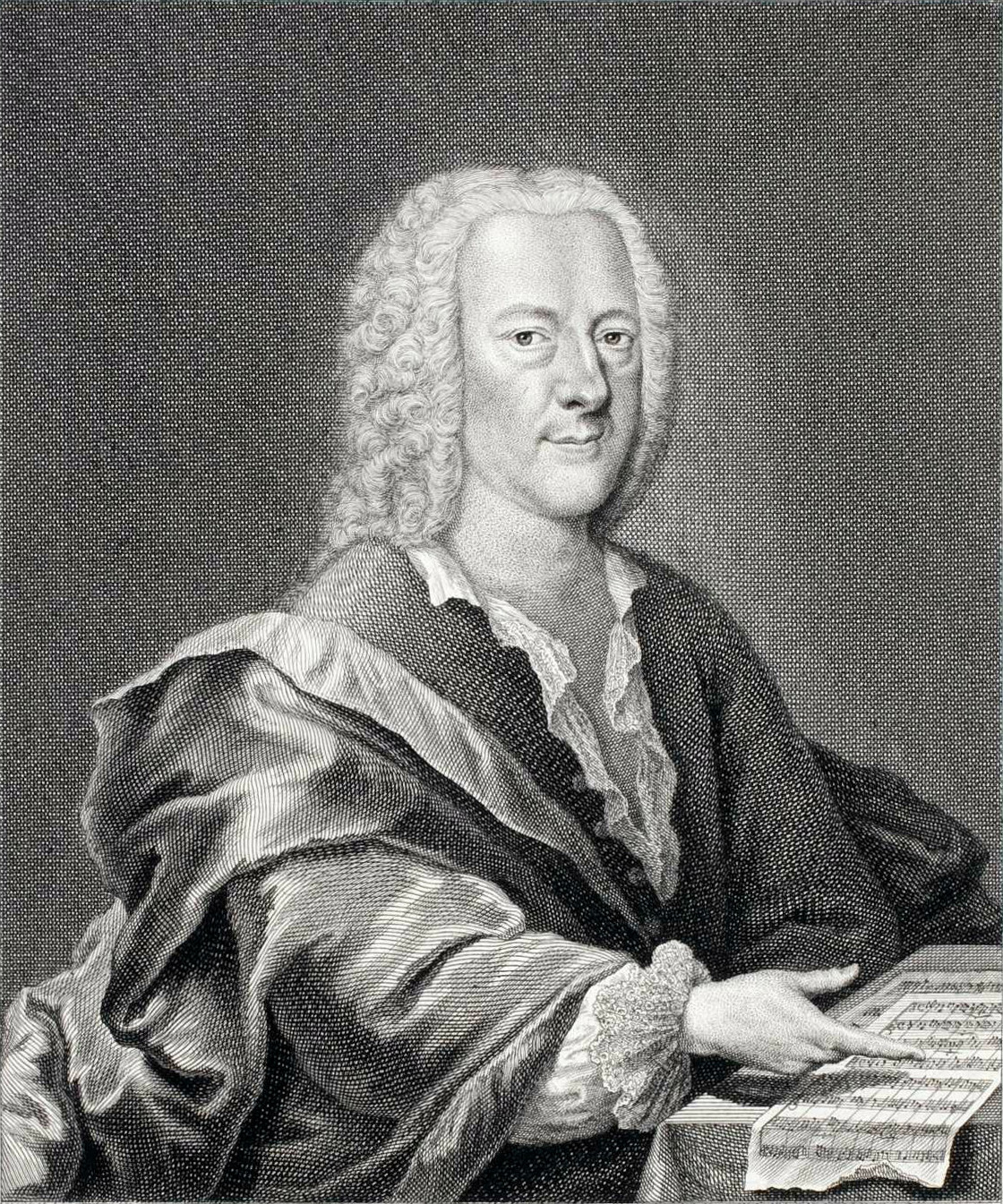
- The composer, c. 1745
- Librettist: Stefano Ghisi Nobil Veneto
- Language: German
- Based on: Flavio Bertarido, Ré de Longobardi
- Premiere: 1729; Oper am Gänsemarkt, Hamburg

Flavius Bertaridus, König der Langobarden (TVWV 21:27) is an opera by Georg Philipp Telemann performed in Hamburg at the Oper am Gänsemarkt in 1729. It is Telemann's only surviving opera in the German equivalent of the opera seria genre.

The opera is based on the libretto Flavio Bertarido, Ré de Longobardi by Stefano Ghisi Nobil Veneto, which was originally set by Carlo Francesco Pollarolo at the Teatro San Giovanni Grisostomo in 1706. Christoph Gottlieb Wend and Telemann himself worked on rewriting the recitatives, and several of the arias and adding German chorus sections, but preserved some Italian aria texts which, according to the fashion as seen in Telemann's Orpheus, was normal at the cosmopolitan Hamburg Opera. However Wend and Telemann departed from Hamburg custom by avoiding all comic parts in the opera, following the agenda of Johann Mattheson, rather than the preferences of the largely middle class audience.
