= Marcus Lloyd =

English dramatist and playwright

Marcus Lloyd (born 1965) is an English dramatist and playwright known for works including Dead Certain and A Relative Stranger.

== Early life and education ==
Lloyd, the eldest of four children of opera singer Robert Lloyd, grew up in Finchley, London. Having attended a local comprehensive school, he went on to study physics at Worcester College, Oxford and then drama writing with playwright Bernard Kops while supporting himself working in the cloakroom of the Royal Opera House, Covent Garden.

== Career and awards ==
In 1995 his first play, Taking Pictures was directed by Gerard Murphy. It starred Kevin Elyot and Rebecca Thorn and was a winner in the New London Radio Playwrights Festival.

The following year he won BBC Television's Double Exposure screenwriting award for his 60-minute television play, A Relative Stranger, which was first broadcast on BBC2 in 1996 starring Siobhan Redmond (Alison Fraiman), Suzanna Hamilton (Jenny Bell), Ioan Gruffudd (Nigel Fraiman) and Jason Isaacs (Peter Fraiman).

Dead Certain, his first stage play, was first produced in 1999 at the Theatre Royal, Windsor and starred Jenny Seagrove (Elizabeth) and Steven Pinder (Michael). It has since received numerous other productions in the UK, New Zealand, Australia, Singapore and the US, including a year-long run in San Francisco.

In 2001 his screenplay Cuckoo won the prestigious Oscar Moore Foundation Screenwriting Prize and the award, presented by patron Emma Thompson, enabled him to devote himself full-time to writing.

Other screenplays include, Wake Up Dead for Stephen Garrett and Paul Webster at Kudos Film & Television, and a screen adaptation of Brian Aldiss's classic science fiction story, Non-Stop for Lightship Films.

In 2015 "Dead Certain" was adapted for Polish TV and broadcast on TVP1 under the title Zabojcza Pewnosc on 23 March (Dir. Mariusz. With: Magdalena Cielecka and Grzegorz Malecki)

Other work includes the short films: To The Grave; Miriam (which featured Roger Lloyd-Pack in his final screen appearance); and The Interview (2007); the radio plays Vacant Possession and The True Story of Mr. Box; and the children's stage play "The Front To Back Toyshop."

== Works ==
- Taking Pictures (1995)
- A Relative Stranger BBC TV (1996)
- Vacant Possession Radio Play (1997)
- The True Story of Mr Box Radio Play (1998)
- The Front to Back Toy Shop Children's play
- Dead Certain (1999) ISBN 0-85676-239-3 Amazon.co.uk ]index
- Cuckoo (2001)
- Wake Up Dead (2006) U.K.’s best unproduced movies on list
- The Interview Short film (2007)
- Miriam Short Film (2014) "MIRIAM", Short Film by Esther Hegarty (United Kingdom) - #NYPremiere
- Zabojcza Pewnosc TV (2015) Zabójcza pewność Teatr TV
- To the Grave Short Film (2016) To The Grave
