= Robert Lloyd (bass) =

English operatic bass

Robert Andrew Lloyd CBE (born 2 March 1940) is an English operatic bass.

== Early life and education ==
Born in Southend-on-Sea, Essex, Lloyd was educated at Keble College, Oxford, and studied in London with the baritone Otakar Kraus.

== Career ==
He made his debut with University College Opera in 1969 as Don Fernando in Leonore, the early version of Fidelio. From 1969 to 1972 he was Principal Bass with the Sadler's Wells Opera Company (now English National Opera), and from 1972 to 1982 was a member of the Royal Opera, Covent Garden. He made 195 appearances with the Metropolitan Opera, New York City, during the period 1988–2008.

He has sung leading roles at Glyndebourne and with other British opera companies, and has appeared in major opera houses throughout the world. He sings roles in British, German, Italian, French and Russian works (Claggart and Superintendent Budd in Benjamin Britten's Billy Budd and Albert Herring, the Priest and Angel of Agony in Edward Elgar's The Dream of Gerontius; Sarastro in The Magic Flute, Osmin in The Abduction from the Seraglio, Rocco in Fidelio, Seneca in The Coronation of Poppea, Gurnemanz in Parsifal, Fasolt in Das Rheingold; Don Basilio in The Barber of Seville, Fiesco in Simon Boccanegra, Philippe II in Don Carlos; Arkel in Pelléas et Mélisande, Comte des Grieux in Manon, Narbal in Les Troyens; the title-role in Boris Godunov). He also sings sacred music and has recorded as bass soloist in the Mozart Requiem.

== Adult life ==
He was made a Commander of the Order of the British Empire (CBE) in 1991 for his services to music.

Lloyd has four children. The eldest is Marcus Lloyd, a playwright and dramatist.

== Recordings ==
Robert Lloyd has made numerous recordings, including:

- Albert Herring [as Superintendent Budd] (conductor: Steuart Bedford), 1996, Naxos
- Il barbiere di Siviglia (conductor: Sir Neville Marriner), 1983, Philips
- Béatrice et Bénédict (conductor: Sir Colin Davis), 1977, Philips
- La bohème (conductor: Sir Colin Davis), 1979, Philips
- I Capuleti e i Montecchi (conductor: Giuseppe Patanè, 1975, EMI
- Carmen (conductor: Claudio Abbado), 1977, DG
- Les contes d'Hoffmann [as Crespel] (conductor: Julius Rudel), 1972, Westminster
- Don Giovanni (conductor: Sir Neville Marriner), 1990, Philips
- Don Carlo (conductor: Bernard Haitink), 1997, Philips
- The Dream of Gerontius (conductor: Sir Adrian Boult), 1975, EMI
- Die Entführung aus dem Serail (conductor: Sir Colin Davis), 1978, Philips
- La fanciulla del West (conductor: Zubin Mehta), 1977, DG
- Fidelio (conductor: David Parry), 2005, Chandos
- Lucia di Lammermoor (conductor: Nicola Rescigno), 1983, EMI
- Macbeth (conductor: Giuseppe Sinopoli), 1983, Philips
- Great Mass in C Minor - Mozart (chorus master: László Heltay), 1994, Philips
- Messiah - Haendel (conductor: Sir Neville Marriner), Dublin 1992, Philips DVD
- A Midsummer Night's Dream (conductor: Sir Colin Davis), 1996, Philips
- Messa da Requiem - Verdi (conductor: Richard Hickox), 1996, Chandos
- Le nozze di Figaro (conductor: Sir Neville Marriner), 1986, Philips
- Parsifal (conductor: Armin Jordan), 1981, Erato
- Requiem - Mozart (conductor: Sir Neville Marriner), 1991, Philips
- Das Rheingold (conductor: Sir Reginald Goodall), 1975, Chandos
- Werther (conductor: Sir Colin Davis), 1981, Philips
- Die Zauberflöte (conductor: Sir Charles Mackerras), 1991, Telarc

He can be seen on video as Boris Godunov, Rocco, Gurnemanz, Seneca and as Daland in The Flying Dutchman. He sang the title role in the 1988 film (director, Lesley Megahey) of Béla Bartók's opera Duke Bluebeard's Castle.

== See also ==
- Massenet: Werther (Colin Davis recording)
- Mozart: La clemenza di Tito (Colin Davis recording)
