= Audun Iversen =

Norwegian baritone

Audun Iversen is a Norwegian baritone. He began singing at the age of twenty-two. He won the Queen Sonja International Music Competition in 2007 and made the final of the Hans Gabor Belvedere Singing Competition in Vienna as well as winning the Ingrid Bjoner Scholarship, the first singer to do so.

Audun has performed at the Royal Opera House in London, Deutsche Oper Berlin, San Francisco Opera, Theater an der Wien, English National Opera, Royal Danish Opera and Opera di Roma.

In 2014, he made his debut at the Lyric Opera of Chicago as Olivier in Capriccio.
