= José Carreras =

Spanish tenor (born 1946)

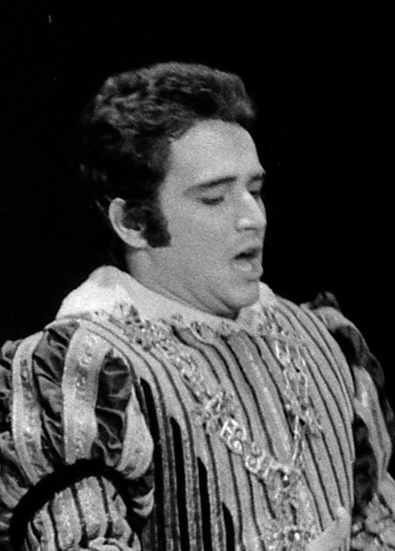
- Carreras as Don Carlo in 1972
- Born: Josep Maria Carreras Coll; 5 December 1946 (age 79); Barcelona, Spain
- Occupation: Opera singer (tenor)
- Years active: 1954–present
- Spouses: Mercedes Pérez (m. 1971; div. 1992) Jutta Jäger (m. 2006; sep. 2011)
- Children: 2

Josep Maria Carreras Coll (Note: In this Catalan name, the first or paternal surname is Carreras and the second or maternal family name is Coll; both are generally joined by the conjunction "i".) (Catalan: [ʒuˈzɛb məˈɾi.ə kəˈreɾəs ˈkɔʎ]; (Note: In isolation, Josep is pronounced [ʒuˈzɛp].) born 5 December 1946), better known as José Carreras (/kəˈrɛərəs/, Spanish: [xoˈse kaˈreɾas]), is a Spanish operatic tenor who is particularly known for his performances in the operas of Donizetti, Verdi and Puccini.

Born in Barcelona, he made his debut on the operatic stage at 11 as Trujamán in Manuel de Falla's El retablo de Maese Pedro, and went on to a career that encompassed over 60 roles, performing in the world's leading opera houses and on numerous recordings. He gained fame with a wider audience as one of the Three Tenors, with Plácido Domingo and Luciano Pavarotti, in a series of large concerts from 1990 to 2003. (Note: A further concert was to have taken place on 4 June 2005 in Monterrey, Mexico. Although it was originally billed as a Three Tenors concert, only Carreras, Domingo and the Mexican singer Alejandro Fernández performed. Luciano Pavarotti withdrew at the last moment for health reasons.) He is also known for his humanitarian work as president of the José Carreras International Leukaemia Foundation (La Fundació Internacional Josep Carreras per a la Lluita contra la Leucèmia), which he established following his own recovery from the disease in 1988.

== Life and career ==
=== Early years ===
Carreras was born in Sants, a working-class district in Barcelona. He was the youngest of Antònia Coll i Saigi and Josep Carreras i Soler's three children. In 1951, his family emigrated to Argentina in search of a better life. However, this move abroad proved unsuccessful, and within a year they had returned to Sants where Carreras was to spend the rest of his childhood and teenage years.

Carreras, age 8, in his first public performance. Spanish National Radio, December 1954.

He showed an early talent for music and particularly singing, which intensified at the age of six when he saw Mario Lanza in The Great Caruso. The story recounted in his autobiography and numerous interviews is that after seeing the film, Carreras sang the arias incessantly to his family, especially "La donna è mobile", often locking himself in the family's bathroom when they became exasperated with his impromptu concerts. At that point, his parents, with the encouragement of his grandfather Salvador Coll, an amateur baritone, found the money for music lessons for him. At first he studied piano and voice with Magda Prunera, the mother of one of his childhood friends, and at the age of eight, he also started taking music lessons at Barcelona's Municipal Conservatory.

At just eight years old, he also gave his first public performance, singing "La donna è mobile", accompanied by Magda Prunera on the piano, on Spanish National Radio. A recording of this still exists and can be heard on the video biography, José Carreras – A Life Story. On 3 January 1958, at the age of eleven, he made his debut in Barcelona's great opera house, the Gran Teatre del Liceu, singing the boy soprano role of Trujamán in Manuel de Falla's El retablo de Maese Pedro. A few months later, he sang for the last time as a boy soprano at the Liceu in the second act of La Bohème.

Throughout his teenage years, he continued to study music, moving on to the Conservatori Superior de Música del Liceu and taking private voice lessons, first with Francisco Puig and later with Juan Ruax, whom Carreras has described as his "artistic father". Following the advice of his father and brother, who felt that he needed a "backup" career, he also entered the University of Barcelona to study chemistry, but after two years he left the university to concentrate on singing.

=== 1970s and 1980s ===
Juan Ruax encouraged Carreras to audition for what was to become his first tenor role at the Liceu, Flavio in Norma, which opened on 8 January 1970. Although only a minor role, the few phrases he sang caught the attention of the production's leading lady, the eminent soprano and fellow Catalan, Montserrat Caballé. She asked him to sing Gennaro with her in Donizetti's Lucrezia Borgia, which opened on 19 December 1970. It was his first principal adult role, and the one which he considers to be his true debut as a tenor. In 1971, he made his international debut in a concert performance of Maria Stuarda in London's Royal Festival Hall, again with Caballé singing the title role. Caballé was instrumental in promoting and encouraging his career for many years, appearing in over fifteen different operas with him, while her brother and manager, Carlos Caballé, was also Carreras's manager until the mid-1990s.

During the 1970s, Carreras's career progressed rapidly. In late-1971, he won first prize in Parma's prestigious Voci Verdiane competition which led to his Italian debut as Rodolfo in La bohème at the Teatro Regio di Parma on 12 January 1972. Later that year, he made his American debut as Pinkerton in Madama Butterfly with the New York City Opera. Other major house debuts followed – the San Francisco Opera in 1973, as Rodolfo; the Philadelphia Lyric Opera Company in 1973, as Alfredo in La traviata; the Vienna Staatsoper in 1974, as the Duke of Mantua in Rigoletto; London's Royal Opera House in 1974, as Alfredo; the New York Metropolitan Opera in 1974, as Cavaradossi in Tosca; and La Scala, Milan in 1975, as Riccardo in Un ballo in maschera. By the age of 28, he had already sung the tenor lead in 24 different operas in both Europe and North America, and had an exclusive recording contract with Philips, which resulted in valuable recordings of several less often performed Verdi operas, notably Il Corsaro, I due Foscari, La battaglia di Legnano, Un giorno di regno and Stiffelio.

Carreras portraying Julián Gayarre in the film Romanza Final (1986)

Carreras's leading ladies during the 1970s and 1980s included some of the most famous sopranos and mezzo-sopranos of the day: Montserrat Caballé, Birgit Nilsson, Viorica Cortez, Renata Scotto, Ileana Cotrubaș, Sylvia Sass, Teresa Stratas, Dame Kiri Te Kanawa, Frederica von Stade, Agnes Baltsa, Teresa Berganza, and Katia Ricciarelli. His artistic partnership with Ricciarelli began when they both sang in the 1972 La bohème at Parma and lasted for thirteen years, both in the recording studio and on stage. They later made a studio recording of La bohème for Philips Classics and can be heard together on over 12 other commercial recordings of both operas and recitals, predominantly on the Philips and Deutsche Grammophon labels. (Note: Recordings from this era have appeared in the sound tracks of several films, including Only You, 1994, directed by Norman Jewison ('Libiamo nei lieti calici' from La traviata); Hoodlum, 1997, directed by Bill Duke ('E lucevan le Stelle' from Tosca); and Bats, 1999, directed by Louis Morneau (excerpts from Lucia di Lammermoor).)

Of the many conductors he worked with during this period, the one with whom Carreras had the closest artistic relationship and who had the most profound influence on his career was Herbert von Karajan. He first sang under Karajan in the Verdi Requiem at Salzburg on 10 April 1976, with their final collaboration in a 1986 production of Carmen, again at Salzburg. With Karajan's encouragement, he increasingly moved towards singing heavier lirico-spinto roles, including Aida, Don Carlos, and Carmen, which some critics have said were too heavy for his natural voice and may have shortened his vocal prime. (See the section on Carreras's voice.)

The 1980s saw Carreras occasionally moving outside the strictly operatic repertoire, at least in the recording studio, with recitals of songs from zarzuela, musicals and operettas. He also made full-length recordings of two musicals – West Side Story (1985) and South Pacific (1986) – both with Kiri Te Kanawa as his co-star. The recording of West Side Story was unusual in two respects: Carreras was chosen and conducted by Leonard Bernstein. Bernstein was conducting for the first time nearly 30 years after he composed the music, and a full-length documentary was made about the recording sessions. In a now-viral clip, the star tenor had problems with the syncopated rhythms and elocution in his solo on Something's Coming and was relentlessly corrected by Bernstein. His 1987 Philips recording of the Argentine folk mass, Misa Criolla, conducted by its composer, Ariel Ramírez, brought the work to a worldwide audience. Although many of Carreras's stage performances are available on video, he also ventured into film. In 1986, he portrayed the 19th century Spanish tenor Julián Gayarre in Romanza Final (The Final Romance) and in 1987, he started working on a film version of La bohème directed by Luigi Comencini.

It was during the filming of La Bohème in Paris that he was found to be suffering from acute lymphoblastic leukemia and given a 1-in-10 chance of survival. However, he recovered from the disease after undergoing a treatment involving chemotherapy, radiation therapy and an autologous Bone marrow transplant at the Fred Hutchinson Cancer Research Center in Seattle. Following his recovery, he gradually returned to both the operatic and the concert stage, embarking on a tour of come-back recitals in 1988 and 1989 and singing with Montserrat Caballé in Medea (Mérida, Spain 1989) and in the world premiere of Balada's Cristóbal Colón (Barcelona, 1989).

=== 1990–present ===
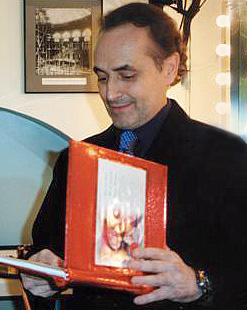
Carreras backstage at the Royal Albert Hall, December 2001

The 1990s continued to see Carreras performing on the operatic stage in Carmen and Fedora and making role debuts in Samson et Dalila (Peralada, 1990), Verdi's Stiffelio (London, 1993), and Wolf-Ferrari's Sly (Zurich, 1998). However, his opera performances became less frequent as he increasingly devoted himself to concerts and recitals. His final operatic performances at the Gran Teatre del Liceu, the opera house where his career began, were in Samson et Dalila (March 2001). He reprised the title role in Sly in Tokyo in 2002 and in 2004 performed at the Vienna State Opera in fully staged versions of the final act of Carmen and Act 3 of Sly. In April 2014, Carreras returned to the opera stage after a ten-year absence singing the title role of Christian Kolonovits's opera, El Juez (The Judge) in its premiere at the Arriaga Theatre in Bilbao. He reprised the role in August 2014 at the Festival Erl in Austria and in January 2015 at the Mariinsky Theatre in St. Petersburg.

In 1990 the first Three Tenors concert took place in the Baths of Caracalla in Rome on the eve of the 1990 FIFA World Cup finals. It was originally conceived to raise money for Carreras's leukemia foundation and as a way for his colleagues, Plácido Domingo and Luciano Pavarotti, to welcome their "little brother" back to the world of opera. However, it and the subsequent Three Tenors concerts brought Carreras a fame that went far beyond the opera house. It is estimated that over a billion people around the world watched the television broadcast of the 1994 Three Tenors concert in Los Angeles. By 1999, the CD from the first Three Tenors concert in Rome had sold an estimated 13 million copies, making it the best-selling classical recording of all time. The early 1990s also saw Carreras serving as the musical director for the opening and closing ceremonies of the 1992 Barcelona Olympic Games, and performing in a worldwide concert tour in tribute to his first singing hero, Mario Lanza.

By the 2000s Carreras's recording and live concert repertoire had moved largely to art song, Neapolitan songs, the light classical genre, and 'easy-listening'. He has also increasingly performed and recorded with artists from outside the classical music world, such as Diana Ross, Edyta Górniak, Lluís Llach, Peter Maffay, Udo Jürgens, Klaus Meine, Charles Aznavour, Kim Styles, Sarah Brightman, Vicky Leandros, Jackie Evancho, Sissel Kyrkjebø, Debbie Harry, Majida El Roumi, and Giorgia Fumanti. Beginning in 2002, Carreras scaled back his live performances to recitals and orchestral concerts.

In an interview published in The Times on 8 May 2009, Carreras announced that he would no longer perform principal opera roles but was still open to recitals.

=== Humanitarian work ===
Carreras visiting a leukaemia patient on the cover of Amigos de la Fundación, July 2005

Following his own recovery from leukaemia, Carreras sought both to repay the debt he owed to medical science and to improve the lives and care of other leukaemia sufferers. On 14 July 1988, he established the Fundació Internacional Josep Carreras per a la Lluita contra la Leucèmia (known in English as the José Carreras International Leukaemia Foundation) in Barcelona. The foundation, which publishes a tri-monthly magazine on its activities, Amigos de la Fundación, concentrates its efforts in four main areas:

- Development of clinical research into the cure and treatment of leukaemia through scholarships and research grants.
- Campaigns to increase bone marrow and cord blood donation for leukaemia patients requiring transplants, along with the operation of REDMO, the Spanish national registry of bone marrow donors.
- Strengthening of the research and clinical infrastructures in both leading international institutions and hospitals and laboratories in the developing world.
- Provision of social services to leukemia patients and their families, including free accommodation near transplant centres.

The José Carreras International Leukaemia Foundation also has affiliates in the U.S., Switzerland, and Germany, with the German affiliate the most active of the three. Since 1995, Carreras has presented an annual live television benefit gala in Leipzig to raise funds for the foundation's work in Germany. Since its inception, the gala alone has raised well over €71 million. Carreras also performs at least 20 charity concerts a year in aid of his foundation and other medical related charities. He is an Honorary Member of the European Society for Medicine and the European Haematology Association, an Honorary Patron of the European Society for Medical Oncology, and a Goodwill Ambassador for UNESCO.

=== Awards and distinctions ===
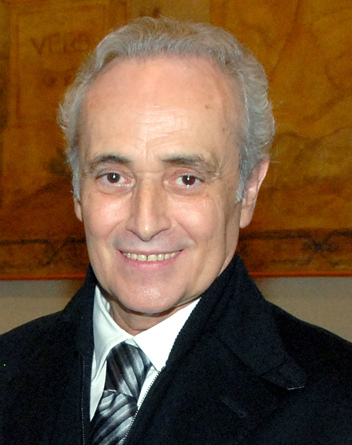
Carreras in 2010

Carreras has received numerous awards and distinctions for both his artistic and humanitarian work. These include: Knight Grand Cross (First Class) of the Most Exalted Order of the White Elephant of Thailand (2019); Commander of the Ordre des Arts et des Lettres and Chevalier of the Légion d'honneur (France); Knight Grand Cross and Grand Officer of the Order of Merit of the Italian Republic (20 May 1996 and 3 April 1991, respectively); Grand Decoration of Honour for Services to the Republic of Austria (1999); the Cruz de Oro del Orden Civil de la Solidaridad Social from Queen Sofía of Spain, the Prince of Asturias Prize for Art (joint winner, 1991), the Grand Cross of Merit from the Federal Republic of Germany and the Gold Medal of the Generalitat of Catalonia (June 1984).

Carreras has received the Bavarian Order of Merit, the Steiger Award (2006) and the St. George Order of the Semperoper (Dresden, 2010).

Honorary Medal of the city of Leipzig on the occasion of his Leukemia Fundraiser for 2009 on 17 December 2009; awarded by the Mayor of Leipzig (unanimous decision of the town council of Leipzig).

In 1993 he was awarded an honorary degree of Doctor of Letters from Loughborough University.

On 23 February 2004, the Austrian Post Office issued a 1€ stamp to commemorate the 30th anniversary of his debut at the Vienna Staatsoper.

In 2004, he received the Golden Plate Award of the American Academy of Achievement.

In 2009, he received the Brit Award for Outstanding Contribution to Music.

He has Honorary Doctorates from the University of Barcelona and Miguel Hernández University (Spain); Napier, Loughborough and Sheffield universities (United Kingdom); the Mendeleev Russian University of Chemistry and Technology (Russia); the University of Camerino (Italy); Rutgers University (United States); the University of Coimbra (Portugal); the National University of Music Bucharest (Romania); Philipps-Universität Marburg (Germany, 3 May 2006); University of Saarland (2012); the University of Pécs (Hungary) and most recently, Kyunghee University (Korea) and the University of Porto (Portugal).

In Spain the central plaza in Sant Joan d'Alacant bears his name, as do two theatres – the Auditori Josep Carreras in Vila-seca (near Tarragona) and The Teatro Josep Carreras in Fuenlabrada.

=== Family ===
Throughout his childhood in Barcelona, Carreras's father, Josep Carreras i Soler, worked as a traffic policeman. He had originally been a French teacher. However, he had fought on the Republican side during the Spanish Civil War, and when the Franco government came into power in 1939, he was no longer allowed to teach. His mother, Antonia Coll i Saigi, ran a small hair-dressing salon, where, as a child, Carreras often sang to the customers in return for pocket money. He was very close to his mother, who was convinced that he would one day be a great singer, and her death from cancer when he was 18 affected him greatly. In José Carreras: A Life Story, he said that "even now, every time I go on stage, I always, always, have a quick thought for her." In 1971 Carreras married Mercedes Pérez. They had two children: a son, Albert (born in 1972), and a daughter, Julia (born in 1978). The marriage ended in divorce in 1992. In 2006, Carreras married Jutta Jäger, but separated from her in 2011. Carreras's nephew, David Giménez Carreras, is a conductor and Director of the Orquestra Simfònica del Vallès. He has conducted many of Carreras's concerts since the late 1990s as well as his opera performances in Sly at the Gran Teatre del Liceu in June 2000. (Note: The 2000 performance of Sly at the Gran Teatre del Liceu was released on the Koch/Schwann label.)

== Voice ==
Carreras in Andrea Chénier, La Scala, 1985

In its prime, Carreras's voice was considered one of the most beautiful tenor voices of the day. The Spanish critic, Fernando Fraga has described it as a lyric tenor with the generosity of a spinto, having "a noble timbre, richly coloured and sumptuously resonant". This is particularly true of the middle range of his voice. Fraga also noted, as has Carreras himself, that even in his youth the high notes of the tenor range were always somewhat problematic for him, and became more so as his career progressed. Like his idol, Giuseppe di Stefano, Carreras was also known for the beauty and expressiveness of his phrasing and for his passionate delivery. These qualities are perhaps best exemplified in his 1976 recording of Tosca with Montserrat Caballé in the title role and conducted by Sir Colin Davis.

According to several critics his assumption of the heavier spinto roles such as Andrea Chénier, Don José in Carmen, Don Carlo, and Alvaro in La forza del destino put a strain on his naturally lyric instrument which may have caused the voice to prematurely darken and lose some of its bloom. Nevertheless, he produced some of his finest performances in those roles.

The Daily Telegraph wrote of his 1984 Andrea Chénier at London's Royal Opera House: "Switching effortlessly from the lyric poet Rodolfo in La Bohème a few weeks ago to the heroic poet Chenier, the Spanish tenor's vocal artistry held us spellbound throughout." Of his 1985 performance in Andrea Chénier at La Scala (preserved on DVD), Carl Battaglia wrote in Opera News that Carreras dominated the opera "with formidable concentration and a cleverly refined vocal accent that imparts to this spinto role an overlay of intensity lacking in his essentially lyric tenor." However, Carl H. Hiller's review of the La Scala performance in Opera also noted that while in the quiet phrases of the score "he could display all the tonal mellowness of which this perhaps most beautiful tenor voice of our time is capable", he had difficulty with the high loud notes, which sounded strained and uneasily produced.

== Recordings ==
=== Complete operas ===
This list is a representative selection of notable commercial recordings from the peak years of José Carreras's career. He has an extremely large discography and videography, which also includes many performances preserved on private recordings.

- Bizet: Carmen (Agnes Baltsa, José Carreras, Leona Mitchell, Samuel Ramey, The Metropolitan Opera Orchestra, James Levine) DVD Deutsche Grammophon 73000
- Bizet: Carmen (Agnes Baltsa, José Carreras, Katia Ricciarelli, José van Dam, Berliner Philharmoniker, Herbert von Karajan) CD Deutsche Grammophon 410 0882
- Donizetti: L'elisir d'amore (Katia Ricciarelli, José Carreras, Leo Nucci, Susanna Rigacci, Domenico Trimarchi, Coro della RAI di Torino, Orchestra Sinfonica Della Rai Di Torino, Claudio Scimone) CD Philips 00289 475 4422
- Donizetti: Lucia di Lammermoor (Montserrat Caballé, José Carreras, Samuel Ramey, New Philharmonia Orchestra, Jesús López-Cobos) CD Philips 00289 470 4212
- Giordano: Andrea Chénier (José Carreras, Piero Cappuccilli, Eva Marton, Nella Verri, Orchestra del Teatro alla Scala, Riccardo Chailly) DVD Kultur ISBN 0-7697-8050-4
- Halévy: La Juive (June Anderson, Julia Varady, José Carreras, Philharmonia Orchestra, Antonio de Almeida) CD Philips 00289 475 7629
- Massenet: Werther (José Carreras, Frederica Stade, Isobel Buchanan, Thomas Allen, Robert Lloyd, Orchestra of the Royal Opera House, Covent Garden, Colin Davis) CD Philips 00289 475 7567. For details, see Werther (Colin Davis recording)
- Puccini: La Bohème (Katia Ricciarelli, José Carreras, Chorus of the Royal Opera House, Covent Garden, Orchestra of the Royal Opera House, Covent Garden, Colin Davis) CD Philips 00289 442 2602
- Puccini: Manon Lescaut (Kiri Te Kanawa, José Carreras, Paolo Coni, Teatro Comunale di Bologna, Riccardo Chailly) CD Decca 460-750-2
- Puccini: Madama Butterfly (Mirella Freni, Teresa Berganza, José Carreras, Juan Pons, Philharmonia Orchestra, Giuseppe Sinopoli) CD Deutsche Grammophon 423 5672
- Puccini: Tosca (Montserrat Caballé, José Carreras, Ingvar Wixell, Chorus of the Royal Opera House, Covent Garden, Orchestra of the Royal Opera House, Covent Garden, Colin Davis) CD Philips 00289 464 7292
- Puccini: Turandot (Eva Marton, José Carreras, Katia Ricciarelli, John-Paul Bogart; 2008 remaster of 1983 Harold Prince video production at Vienna State Opera House, Lorin Maazel) DVD Arthaus Musik 107319
- Rossini: Otello (Frederica von Stade, Nucci Condò, José Carreras, Salvatore Fisichella, Gianfranco Pastine, Samuel Ramey, Ambrosian Chorus, Philharmonia Orchestra, Jesús López Cobos) CD Philips 00289 432 4562. For details, see Otello (Jesús López Cobos recording)
- Saint-Saëns: Samson et Dalila (Agnes Baltsa, José Carreras, Jonathan Summers, Simon Estes, Paata Burchuladze, Bavarian Radio Symphony Orchestra and Chorus, Sir Colin Davis) CD Philips 000289 475 8706
- Strauss: Der Rosenkavalier (Frederica von Stade, Evelyn Lear, Ruth Welting, Jules Bastin, Derek Hammond-Stroud, José Carreras, Rotterdam Philharmonic Orchestra, Edo de Waart) CD Philips 00289 442 0862. For details, see Der Rosenkavalier (Edo de Waart recording)
- Verdi: Un ballo in maschera (Montserrat Caballé, José Carreras, Ingvar Wixell, Chorus of the Royal Opera House, Covent Garden, Orchestra of the Royal Opera House, Covent Garden, Colin Davis) CD Philips 00289 470 5862
- Verdi: Il Corsaro (Montserrat Caballé, Jessye Norman, José Carreras, New Philharmonia Orchestra, Lamberto Gardelli) CD Philips 00289 475 6769
- Verdi: Don Carlo (José Carreras, Agnes Baltsa, Fiamma Izzo D'amico, Piero Cappuccilli, Ferruccio Furlanetto, Berlin Philharmonic, Herbert von Karajan) DVD Sony Classical 48312
- Verdi: I due Foscari (José Carreras, Piero Cappuccilli, Katia Ricciarelli, Samuel Ramey, ORF Symphony Orchestra, Lamberto Gardelli), CD Philips 422426
- Verdi: La forza del destino (Sesto Bruscantini, José Carreras, Montserrat Caballé, Piero Cappuccilli, Nicolai Ghiaurov, Orchestra del Teatro alla Scala, Giuseppe Patanè) CD Myto 984192
- Verdi: Un giorno di regno (Jessye Norman, Fiorenza Cossotto, José Carreras, Ingvar Wixell, Royal Philharmonic Orchestra, Lamberto Gardelli) CD Philips 00289 475 6772
- Verdi: I lombardi alla prima crociata (José Carreras, Ghena Dimitrova, Carlo Bii, Silvano Carroli, Orchestra del Teatro alla Scala, Gianandrea Gavazzeni) DVD Kultur 2036
- Verdi: Simon Boccanegra (Piero Cappuccilli, Mirella Freni, José Carreras, Nicolai Ghiaurov, José van Dam, Orchestra del Teatro alla Scala, Claudio Abbado) CD Deutsche Grammophon 449 7522
- Verdi: Stiffelio (Sylvia Sass, José Carreras, Matteo Manuguerra, ORF Symphony Orchestra, Lamberto Gardelli) CD Philips 00289 475 6775

=== Recitals, sacred music and cross-over ===
- Various: José Carreras Sings Catalan Songs Sony 1991
- Bernstein: West Side Story (with Kiri Te Kanawa, Tatiana Troyanos, Kurt Ollmann, Marilyn Horne, Leonard Bernstein) CD Deutsche Grammophon 457 1992
- Puccini: Messa di Gloria (with Hermann Prey, London Philharmonic Orchestra, Claudio Scimone) CD Erato 48692
- Ramirez: Misa Criolla, Navidad Nuestra CD Philips 420955
- Rodgers: South Pacific (with Kiri Te Kanawa, Sarah Vaughan, Mandy Patinkin, London Symphony Orchestra, Jonathan Tunick) CD Sony MK 42205
- Verdi: Messa da Requiem (with Anna Tomowa-Sintow, Agnes Baltsa, José Van Dam, Vienna Philharmonic, Herbert von Karajan) CD Deutsche Grammophon 439 0332
- Various: Ave Maria (with Vienna Boys Choir, Vienna Symphony Orchestra, Uwe Christian Harrer) Philips 4111382
- Various: José Carreras – The Golden Years (arias and songs by Puccini, Verdi, Donizetti, Massenet, Bizet, Lehár, Handel, Gastoldi, Giordano, Tosti, Cardillo, Denza, de Curtis, Lara, d' Hardelot, Brodszky, Bernstein, Lloyd Webber) CD Philips 462892
- Various: The Very Best of José Carreras (arias from Aida, Macbeth, Cavalleria rusticana, Pagliacci, Turandot, Don Carlo, Carmen, Faust, Roméo et Juliette, Polyeucte, Le Cid, Sappho, Hérodiade, La Juive, L'Africaine, Le Roi d'Ys, La Périchole) CD EMI 7243 5 75903 2 7
- Various: Passion CD Erato (Warner)
- Various: Pure Passion CD Erato (Warner)
- Various: Around the world CD Wea International (Warner)
- Various: Belle Epoque (Tagliaferri, Satie, Puccini, Zemlinsky, Schreker,...) CD Sony Classic (Sony Music)
- Various: Mediterranean Passion CD Sony Classical (Sony Music)
- Various: 25 Meraviglioso CD Embassy of Music (Warner)
- Various: Christmas in Moscow (with Plácido Domingo, Sissel) CD Sony Classical (Sony Music)
- Various: The Metropolitan Opera Centennial Gala, DVD Deutsche Grammophon 00440-073-4538, 2009
