= José Carreras Leukaemia Foundation =

The Josep Carreras Leukaemia Foundation is a private, charitable and non-profitable organization, founded by the tenor José Carreras following his recovery. Carreras founded the Foundation on July 14, 1988, with one single objective: that leukaemia will one day be 100% curable. He wanted to make a permanent testimony to science and society to show his gratitude for the support he received throughout his illness. After that, other branches of the Josep Carreras Foundation against Leukemia were formed in the United States, Switzerland and Germany.

== Strategic Objectives ==
Make society aware of what leukaemia and the rest of haematological malignancies like lymphoma or multiple myeloma are, and how they affect society.

Achieve better quality of life for patients and their families.

Increase the number of bone marrow donors and the units of stored umbilical cord blood, as well as the number of members of the Foundation. Make progress in scientific research projects.
