= The Merry Widow discography =

This is a discography of The Merry Widow (German: Die lustige Witwe), an operetta by the Austro–Hungarian composer Franz Lehár. It was first performed at the Theater an der Wien in Vienna on 30 December 1905. The operetta has been recorded both live and in the studio many times, and several video recordings have been made. The first recording of a substantially complete version of the score was made in 1907 with Marie Ottmann and Gustav Matzner in the lead roles. The next full recording was issued in 1950, in English with Dorothy Kirsten and Robert Rounseville in the leading roles.

In 1953, EMI's Columbia label released a near-complete version produced by Walter Legge, conducted by Otto Ackermann, with Elisabeth Schwarzkopf as Hanna, Erich Kunz as Danilo, Nicolai Gedda as Camille and Emmy Loose as Valencienne. It was sung in German, with abridged spoken dialogue. Loose sang Valencienne again for Decca in the first stereophonic recording, produced in 1958 by John Culshaw, with Hilde Gueden, Per Grundén and Waldemar Kmentt in the other main roles, and the Vienna Philharmonic conducted by Robert Stolz. A second recording with Schwarzkopf as Hanna was issued by Columbia in 1963; the other main roles were sung by Eberhard Wächter, Gedda and Hanny Steffek. This set, conducted by Lovro von Matačić, has been reissued on CD in EMI's "Great Recordings of the Century" series. Among later complete or substantially complete sets are those conducted by Herbert von Karajan with Elizabeth Harwood as Hanna (1972); Franz Welser-Möst with Felicity Lott (1993); and John Eliot Gardiner with Cheryl Studer (1994).

The Ackermann recording received the highest available rating in the 1956 The Record Guide and the later EMI set under Matačić is highly rated by the 2008 The Penguin Guide to Recorded Classical Music, but Alan Blyth in his Opera on CD regrets the casting of a baritone as Danilo in both sets and prefers the 1958 Decca version. Among the filmed productions on DVD, the Penguin Guide recommends the one from the San Francisco Opera, recorded live in 2001, conducted by Erich Kunzel and directed by Lotfi Mansouri, with Yvonne Kenny as Hanna and Bo Skovhus as Danilo.

The recordings listed below are sung in German unless otherwise noted.

== Audio ==
Date	Recording	Conductor	Orchestra (if known)	Notes
1906		unknown		
1907	studio	Bruno Seidler-Winkler	Grammophon-Streich-Orchester	with dialogue
1931	studio (excerpts)	unknown		Sung in Spanish
193?	studio (excerpts)	Paul Minsart	Grand Orchestra	French
1942	studio (excerpts)	Isaac Van Grove		English
1943-44	studio (excerpts)	Isaac Van Grove		English
1948?	studio (excerpts)	Max Rudolf		English
1950	radio	Wilhelm Stephan	Sinfonieorchester des Nordwestdeutschen Rundfunks, Hamburg	
1950?	studio (excerpts)	Al Goodman	Al Goodman Orchestra	English
1950?	studio	Victor Reinshagen	Tonhalle Orchester Zürich	
1951?	studio (excerpts)	George Greeley		English
1952	studio (excerpts)	Lehman Engel		English
1953	studio (excerpts)	Jules Gressier	Orchestre Lamoureux	French
1953	studio	Otto Ackermann	Philharmonia Orchestra	
1953?	studio (excerpts)	Heinz Sandauer	Das große Funkorchester von Radio Wien	
1955	studio (excerpts)	Enrique Montorio, Ricardo Navarro, Daniel Estavarena	Orquesta de Cámera de Madrid	Spanish
1956?	studio	Marcel Cariven	Grande Orchestra	French
1957	studio (excerpts)	Hans Hagen	Vienna Volksoper	
1958	studio (excerpts)	William Reid	Sadler's Wells Opera	English
1958	studio	Robert Stolz	Vienna State Opera	
1959?	studio (excerpts)	R Chevreux		French
1959?	studio (excerpts)	Egon Kjerrman		
1959?	studio (excerpts)	Richard Müller-Lampertz		French
195?	radio	Max Schönherr	Das große Funkorchester von Radio Wien	
195?	studio (excerpts)	Richard Blareau		French
195?	studio (excerpts)	Cesare Gallino	Orchestra Lirica Cetra	Italian
195?	studio (excerpts)	Franz Marszalek	Großes Operetten-Orchester	
195?	studio (excerpts)	Edmund Nick	Munich Philharmonic	
195?	studio (excerpts)	Wilhelm Stephan	Großes Operetten-Orchester	
1960	studio (excerpts)	Franck Pourcel	Orchestre de la Société des Concerts du Conservatoire	French
1960?	studio (excerpts)	Anton Paulik	Großes Operetten-Orchester	
1960?	studio (excerpts)	Werner Schmidt-Boelcke	FFB Orchester	
1960?	studio (excerpts)	George Walter	The Opera Society Orchestra	
1961	studio (excerpts)	Lehman Engel		English
1961	studio (excerpts)	John Hollingsworth	Sinfonia of London	English
1962	studio	Lovro von Matačić	Philharmonia Orchestra	
1962?	studio (excerpts)	Franz Allers	American Opera Society	English
1962?	studio (excerpts)	Jacques Pastory		French
1964	studio (excerpts)	Franz Allers	Music Theater of Lincoln Center	English
1964?	studio (excerpts)	Rudolf Neuhaus	Dresden Philharmonic	
1965	studio	Robert Stolz	Berliner Sinfoniker	
1966	studio	Yvon Leenart	Orchestre de la Société des Concerts du Conservatoire	French
1967	studio (excerpts)	Willy Mattes	Das Symphonieorchester Graunke	
1968	studio (excerpts)	Franz Marszalek	Großes Operetten-Orchester	
1968?	studio (excerpts)	Franz Bauer-Theussl	Vienna State Opera orchestra and Volksoper	
1968?	studio (excerpts)	Vilém Tauský		English
196?	studio (excerpts)	J. Armitage Fuggle	Harrow Light Opera Company	English
196?	studio (excerpts)	Paul Popescu	Romanian National Opera	Rumanian
196?	studio	A Mikhailov	Moscow Operetta Theater	Russian
1970	radio	Adolphe Sibert (Siebert)	Orchestre Lyrique de l'O.R.T.F.	French
1972	studio	Herbert von Karajan	Berlin Philharmonic	
1974	live	Armando Krieger		Spanish
1976	studio (excerpts)	Alexander Gibson	Scottish Philharmonia	English
1977	studio (excerpts)	Richard Bonynge	National Philharmonic Orchestra	English
1978	studio (excerpts)	Julius Rudel	New York City Opera	English
1980	studio	Heinz Wallberg	Munich Radio Orchestra	
1982	live	Rudolf Bibl	Vienna Volksoper	
1986	live	Baldo (Bruno) Podic	Lyric Opera of Chicago	English
1986	studio (excerpts)	Barry Wordsworth	New Sadler's Wells Opera Orchestra	English
1989	live (composite)	Yoko Matsuo	Tokyo Symphony Orchestra	Japanese
198?	studio	Algis Ziuraidis	Large Symphony Orchestra of the USSR Radio and TV	Russian
1993	live (composite)	Franz Welser-Möst	London Philharmonic Orchestra	
1994	studio	John Eliot Gardiner	Vienna Philharmonic	
1997		Helmut Froschauer	Rundfunk-Sinfonie-Orchester Köln	
19??	radio	Cesare Gallino	RAI Torino	Italian
19??	studio (excerpts)	? Bessière		French
19??	studio (excerpts)	Jean Doussard		French
19??	studio (excerpts)	Jean Doussard		French
19??	studio (excerpts)	Laszlo Makláry	Budapest Operetta Theatre	
19??	studio (excerpts)	Boris Mersson	Orchestre des Concerts de Paris	French
19??		Hans Killer		French
2000	live	Andrew Davis	Metropolitan Opera	English
2004	live	Kirill Petrenko	Metropolitan Opera	English
2005	studio	Rudolf Bibl	Orchestra of the Seefestspiele Mörbisch	
2006	live	Cyril Diederich	Orchestre de Chambre de Lausanne	French
2007	live	Graeme Jenkins	Dallas Civic Opera	English
2018	live	Joana Mallwitz	Frankfurter Opern- und Museumsorchester	

== Video ==
Date	Recording	Conductor	Cast: Hanna, Danilo	Orchestra
1952	film (in English)	Jay Blackton	Trudy Erwins, Fernando Lamas	
1977	live (in English)	Theo Alcántara	Beverly Sills, Alan Titus	San Diego Opera
1983	live (in French)	Armin Jordan	Anne Howells, Mikael Melbye	Orchestre de la Suisse Romande
1986	live	Christoph von Dohnányi	Anja Silja, Kurt Schreibmayer	La Monnaie
1988	live (in English)	Richard Bonynge	Joan Sutherland, Ronald Stevens	Sydney Elizabethan Orchestra
1990	live (in Italian)	Daniel Oren	Raina Kabaivanska, Mikael Melbye	Teatro dell'Opera di Roma
1993	live	Konstantin Schenk	Elisabeth Kales, Peter Edelmann	Philharmonie Bratislava
1996	live	Armin Jordan	Jane Thorngren, Michael Hayes	New York City Opera
1997	live	Armin Jordan	Karita Mattila, Bo Skovhus	Opéra national de Paris
2001	live (in English)	Erich Kunzel	Yvonne Kenny, Bo Skovhus	San Francisco Opera
2003	live	Franz Welser-Möst	Dagmar Schellenberger, Rodney Gilfry	Zurich Opera House
2005	live	Rudolf Bibl	Margarita de Arellano, Mathias Hausmann	Orchester des Seefestspiele Mörbisch
2007	live	Manfred Honeck	Petra-Maria Schnitzer, Bo Skovhus	Sächsische Staatskapelle Dresden
2015	live	Sir Andrew Davis	Renee Fleming, Nathan Gunn	Metropolitan Opera
