= Lillie Claus =

Austrian opera singer (1905–2000)

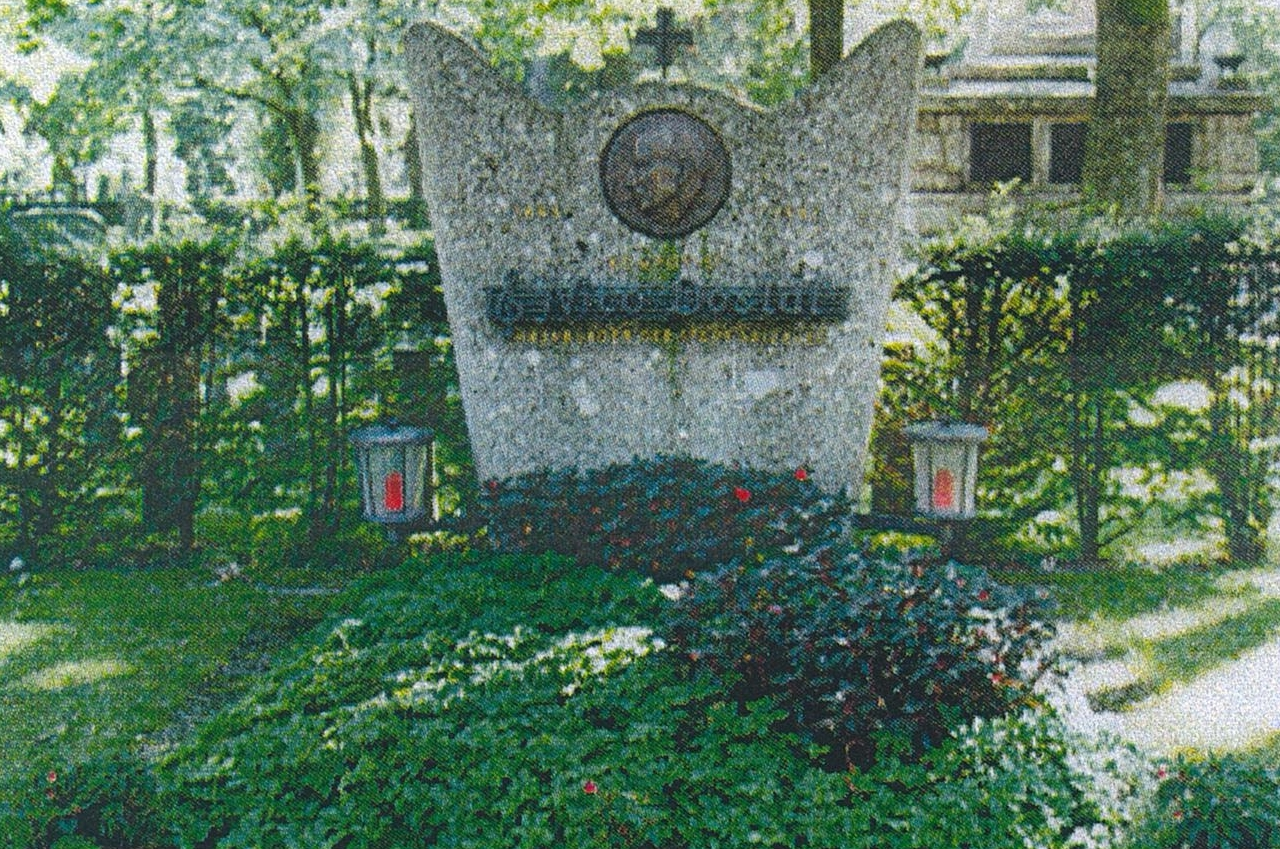
Gravestone of Dostal

Lillie Claus-Dostal (1905–2000) was an Austrian lyric coloratura opera and operetta singer.

== Biography ==
She received a musical education in her youth (vocals, piano, dance school). She entered the Vienna Academy of Music when she was 16 years old. She debuted as Papagena in Mozart's The Magic Flute at the Vienna State Opera.

After engagements at several theatres, she returned to the Vienna State Opera. While there, she heard the composer Nico Dostal was in search a leading singer for his operetta "Clivia". On 23 December 1933, she took part in the premiere in the Berlin theatre on Nollendorfplatz.

On 30 November 1934, she sang the 'Lied der Lulu' (part of the five-movement concert suite version of Alban Berg's opera Lulu) at the Berlin Staatsoper Unter den Linden under Erich Kleiber.

In the ensuing period Lillie Claus focused increasingly on operetta. Nico Dostal wrote several of his operettas for her voice.

- 1933 Clivia (opera)
- 1935 Die Vielgeliebte ( "I am in love")
- 1936 Prinzessin Nofretete
- 1937 Extra leaves ( "I forgot my heart away")
- 1937 Monika ( "Home Song")
- 1939 Die ungarische Hochzeit ( "I play the song of happiness and litter")

In 1942, she married Nico Dostal (1985–?) and retired from singing. Their son Roman Dostal, who later became a conductor, was born in 1943, when the family lived in Salzburg.

== Selected filmography ==
- The Swedish Nightingale (1941)

== Recordings ==
- Eine Grande Dame der Operette: Lillie Claus. Songs from operettas and films. Recordings between 1932 and 1941. Rv-Musik RV2618 CD.
