= Die Fledermaus discography =

This is a discography of Die Fledermaus, an operetta by Johann Strauss II, which was first performed on 5 April 1874 at the Theater an der Wien in Vienna.

== Recordings ==
| Year | Cast (Eisenstein, Rosalinde, Adele, Alfred, Orlofsky) | Conductor, Opera house and orchestra | Label |
|---|---|---|---|
| 1907 | Robert Philipp; Emilie Hoffmann; Marie Dietrich; Julius Lieban; Ida von Scheele-Müller | Bruno Seidler-Winkler; Grammophone Orchestra Berlin; Königliche Hofoper Berlin Chorus | LP: Court Opera Classics; Cat: CO 417/18; CD: Preiser Records; Cat: 89770 |
| 1949 | Peter Anders; Anny Schlemm; Rita Streich; Helmut Krebs; Anneliese Müller | Ferenc Fricsay; Deutsches Symphonie-Orchester Berlin; RIAS Kammerchor | CD: Membran; Cat: 223979; CD: Audite; Cat: 23.411 |
| 1950 | Julius Patzak; Hilde Güden; Wilma Lipp; Anton Dermota; Sieglinde Wagner | Clemens Krauss; Vienna Philharmonic Orchestra; Vienna State Opera Chorus | CD: Nimbus Records; Cat: NI 7954/5; CD: Naxos Records; Cat: 8.110180-81; CD: Regis Records; Cat: RRC2047 |
| 1955 | Nicolai Gedda; Elisabeth Schwarzkopf; Rita Streich; Helmut Krebs; Rudolf Christ | Herbert von Karajan; Philharmonia Orchestra; Philharmonia Chorus | CD: Naxos Records; Cat: 8.111036-37; CD: EMI Classics; Cat: 9668442 |
| 1960 | Waldemar Kmentt; Hilde Güden; Erika Köth; Giuseppe Zampieri; Regina Resnik | Herbert von Karajan; Vienna Philharmonic Orchestra; Vienna State Opera Chorus | CD: Decca Records; Cat: 475 831 9 |
| 1960 | Eberhard Waechter; Hilde Güden; Rita Streich; Giuseppe Zampieri; Gerhard Stolze | Herbert von Karajan; Vienna State Opera Orchestra & Chorus | CD: RCA Records; Cat: 74321 61949 2 |
| 1971 | Eberhard Waechter; Gundula Janowitz; Renate Holm; Waldemar Kmentt; Wolfgang Windgassen | Karl Böhm; Vienna Philharmonic Orchestra; Vienna State Opera Chorus | CD: Decca Records; Cat: 475 621 6 DVD: Deutsche Grammophon; Cat: 001005109 |
| 1971 | Dietrich Fischer-Dieskau; Nicolai Gedda; Anneliese Rothenberger; Renate Holm; Adolf Dallapozza; Brigitte Fassbaender | Willi Boskovsky; Vienna Symphony; Vienna State Opera Chorus | CD: EMI Classics; Cat: 0882842; CD: Musical Heritage Society; Cat: MHS 525856F |
| 1976 | Hermann Prey; Júlia Várady; Lucia Popp; René Kollo; Ivan Rebroff | Carlos Kleiber; Bavarian State Opera Orchestra & Chorus | CD: Deutsche Grammophon; Cat: 457 765–2 |
| 1986 | Peter Seiffert; Lucia Popp; Eva Lind; Plácido Domingo; Agnes Baltsa | Plácido Domingo; Munich Radio Orchestra; Bayerischer Rundfunk Chorus | CD: Angel Records; Cat: DSB-3999; CD: EMI Classics; Cat: 47480–8 |
| 1987 | Werner Hollweg; Edita Gruberová; Barbara Bonney; Josef Protschka; Marjana Lipovšek | Nikolaus Harnoncourt; Royal Concertgebouw Orchestra; De Nederlandse Opera Chorus | CD: Teldec; Cat: 2292 42427–2 |
| 1990 | Wolfgang Brendel; Kiri Te Kanawa; Edita Gruberová; Richard Leech; Brigitte Fassbaender | André Previn; Vienna Philharmonic Orchestra; Vienna State Opera Chorus | CD: Philips Records; Cat: 464 031–2 |
| 1991 | John Dickie; Gabriele Fontana; Brigitte Karwautz; Josef Hopferwieser; Rohangiz Yachmi-Caucig | Johannes Wildner; Slovak Radio Symphony Orchestra; Bratislava City Chorus | CD: Naxos Records; Cat: 8.660017-18 |
| 1995 | David Fieldsend; Rosemarie Atharas; Adey Grummet; Deborah Hawksley; Khosrof Mahsoori | John Owen Edwards; D'Oyly Carte Opera Company (in English) | CD: Sony Records; Cat: 864573 |
| 2018 | Nikolai Schukoff; Laura Aikin; Annika Gerhards; Christian Elsner; Elisabeth Kulman | Lawrence Foster; NDR Radiophilharmonie Orchestra; WDR Rundfunkchor Köln Chorus | CD: Pentatone; Cat: PTC 5186635 |
