= Seefestspiele Mörbisch =

Austrian operetta festival

Coordinates: 47°45′14″N 16°41′56″E

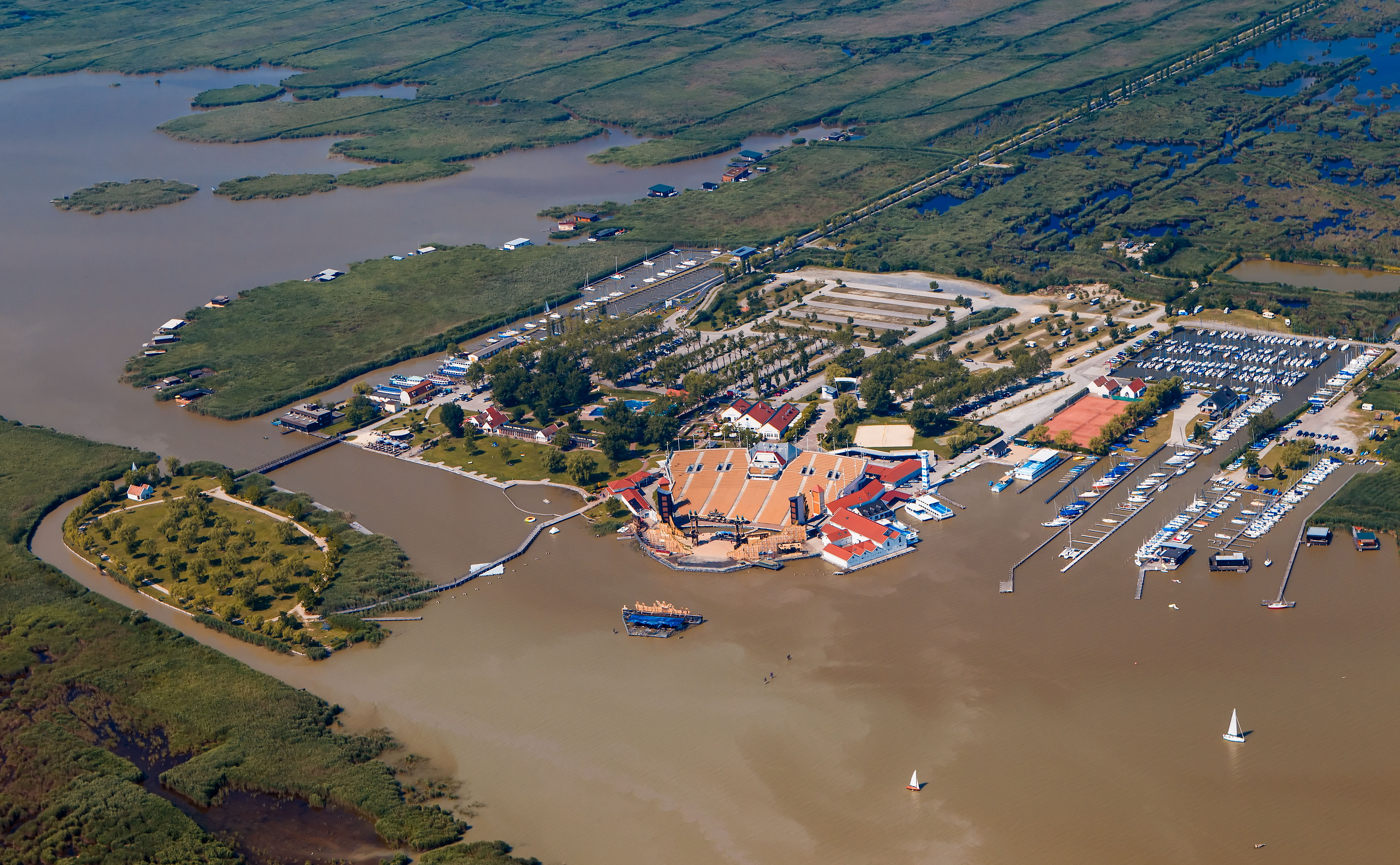
Seebühne Mörbisch am Neusiedlersee

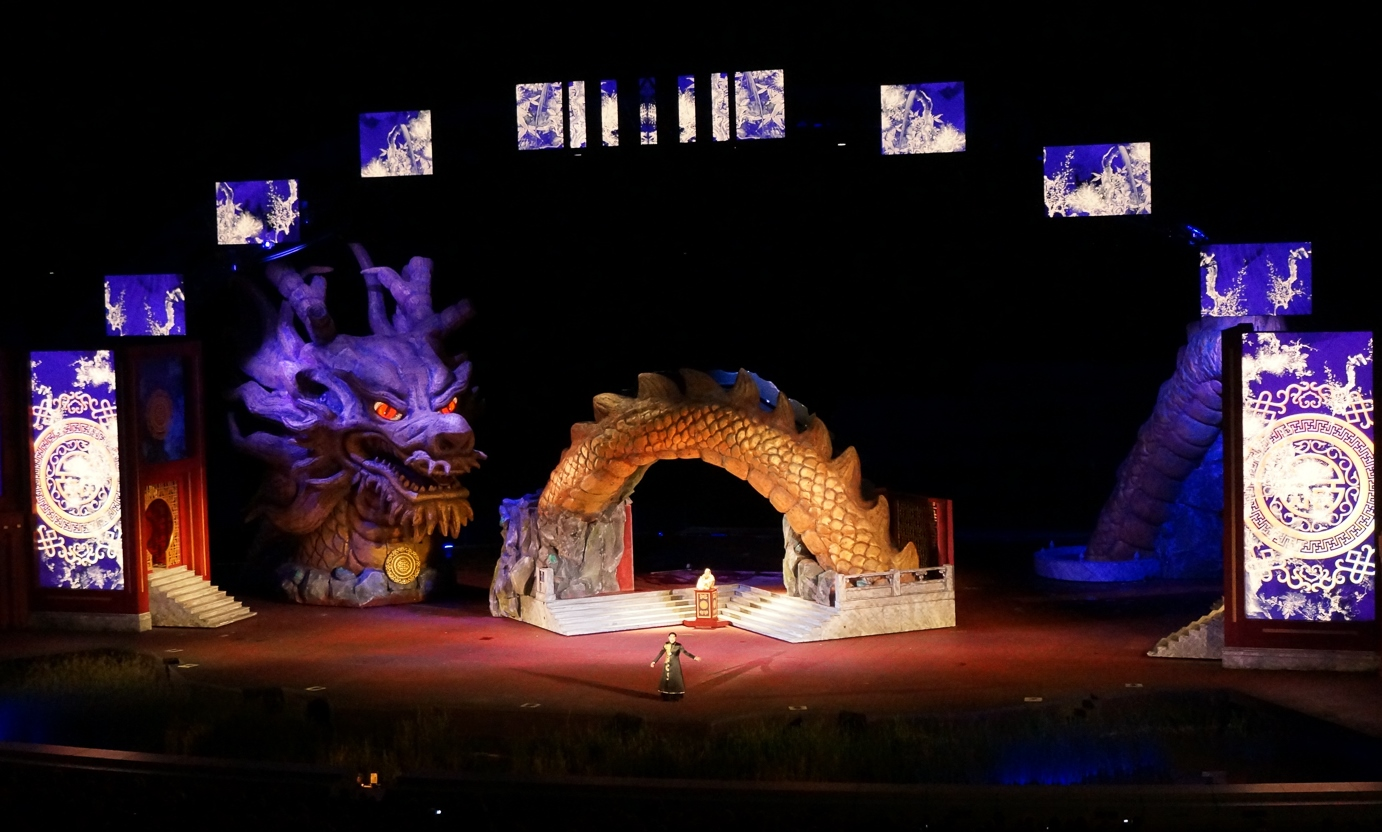
Stage design of Land of Smiles, Franz Lehar (2019)

The Seefestspiele Mörbisch, originally: Seespiele Mörbisch, is an annual operetta festival in Mörbisch am See (Austria). With around 150,000 visitors, the Mörbisch Lake Festival is the world's largest festival of the operetta genre. In addition to operettas, classical musicals are also performed on an irregular basis. Above all, the natural scenery of Neusiedler See is always incorporated into the stage set. The area is very flat, so transmission technology specially developed for the Lake Festival is used.

== History ==
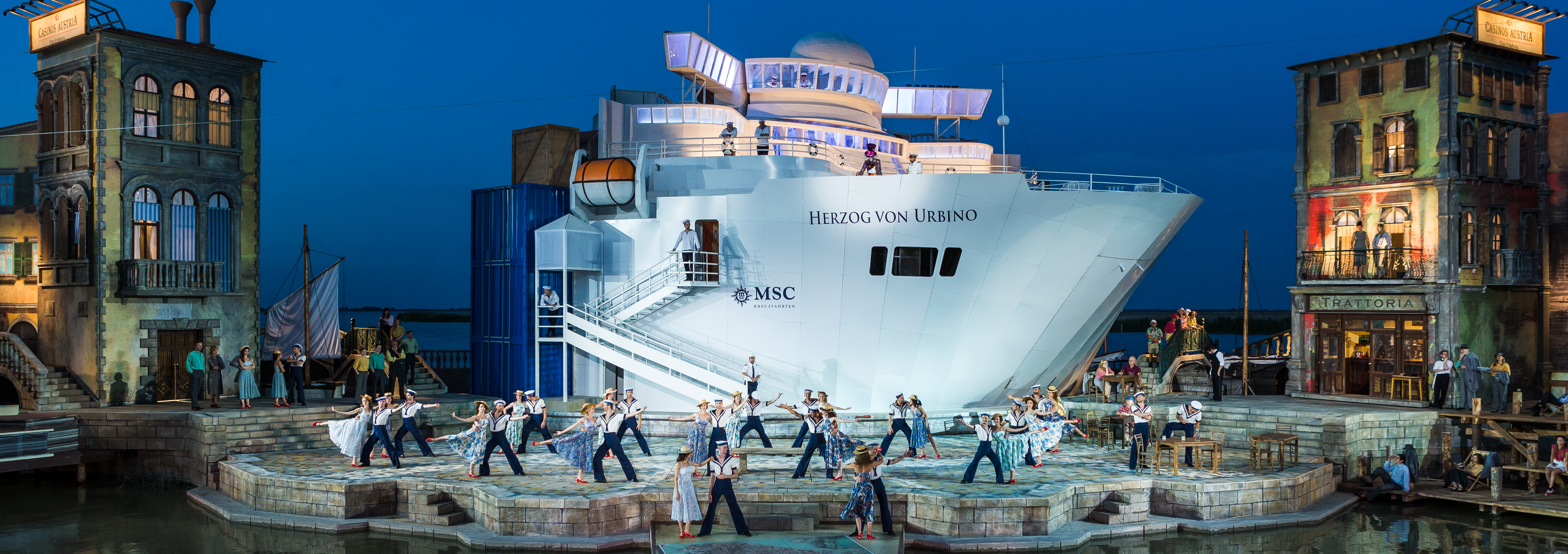
Stage design for Eine Nacht in Venedig (2015)

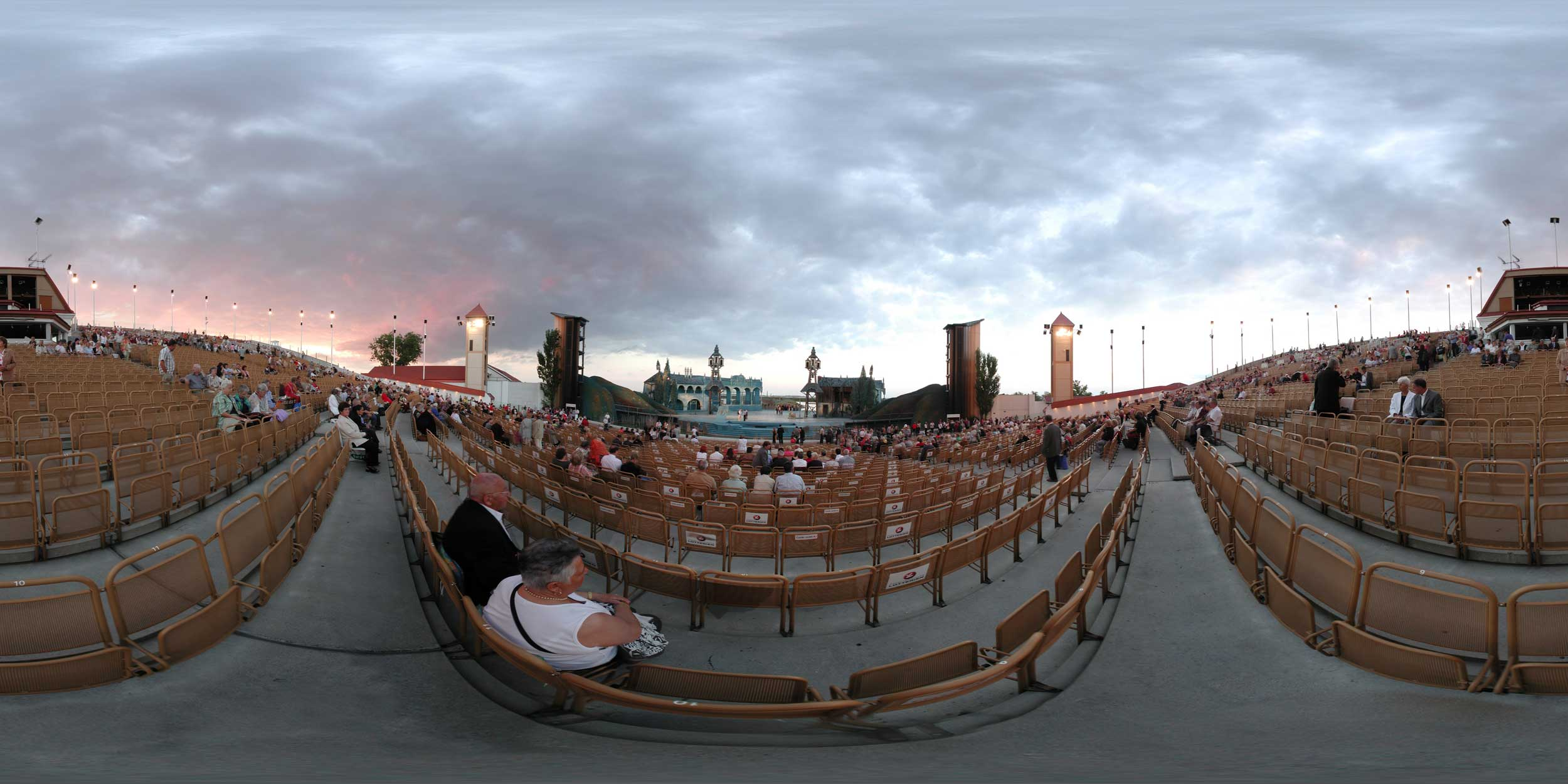
360°x180°-Panoramic picture of theSeefestspiele Mörbisch 2004

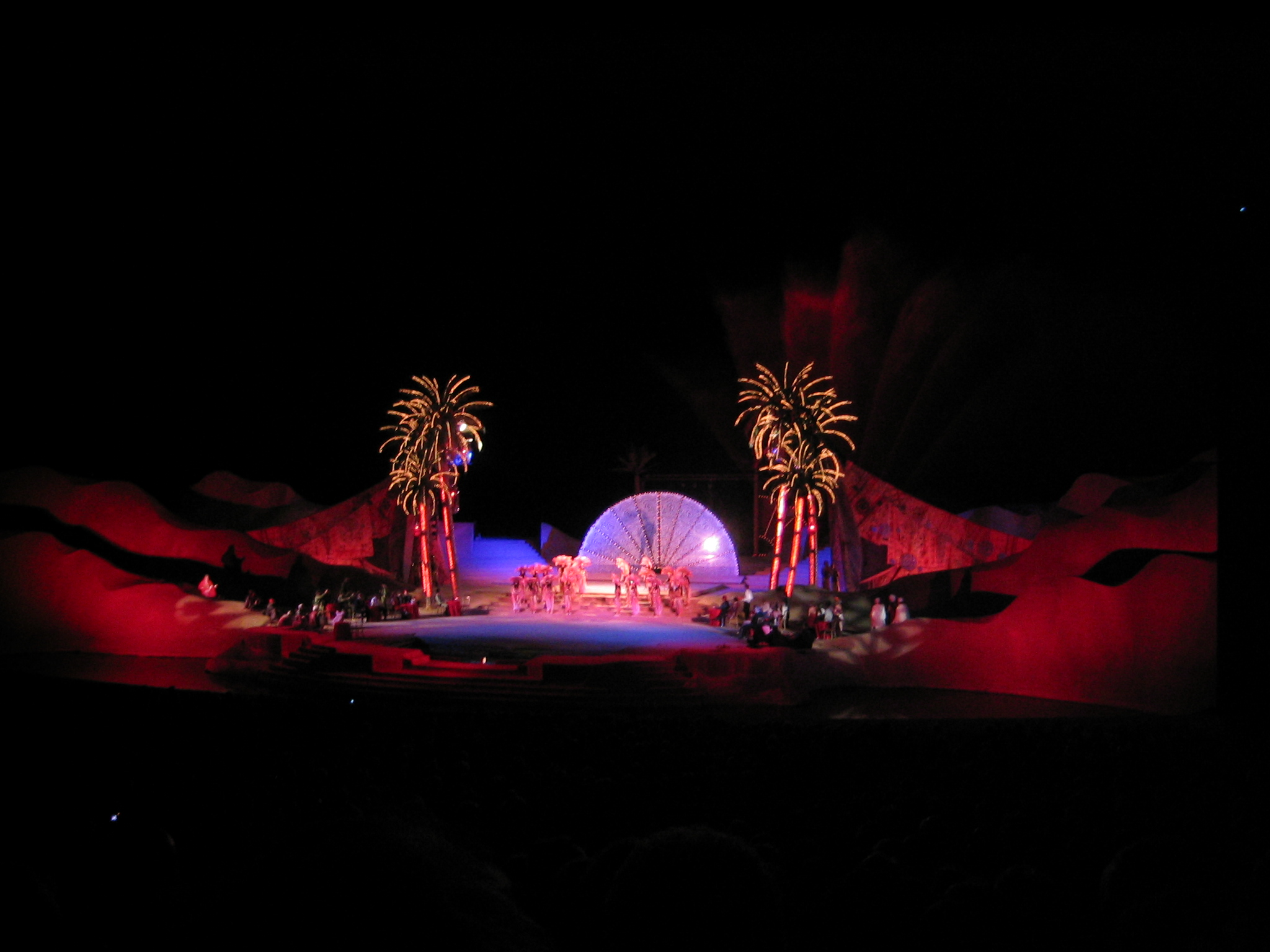
Premiere of Giuditta (2003)

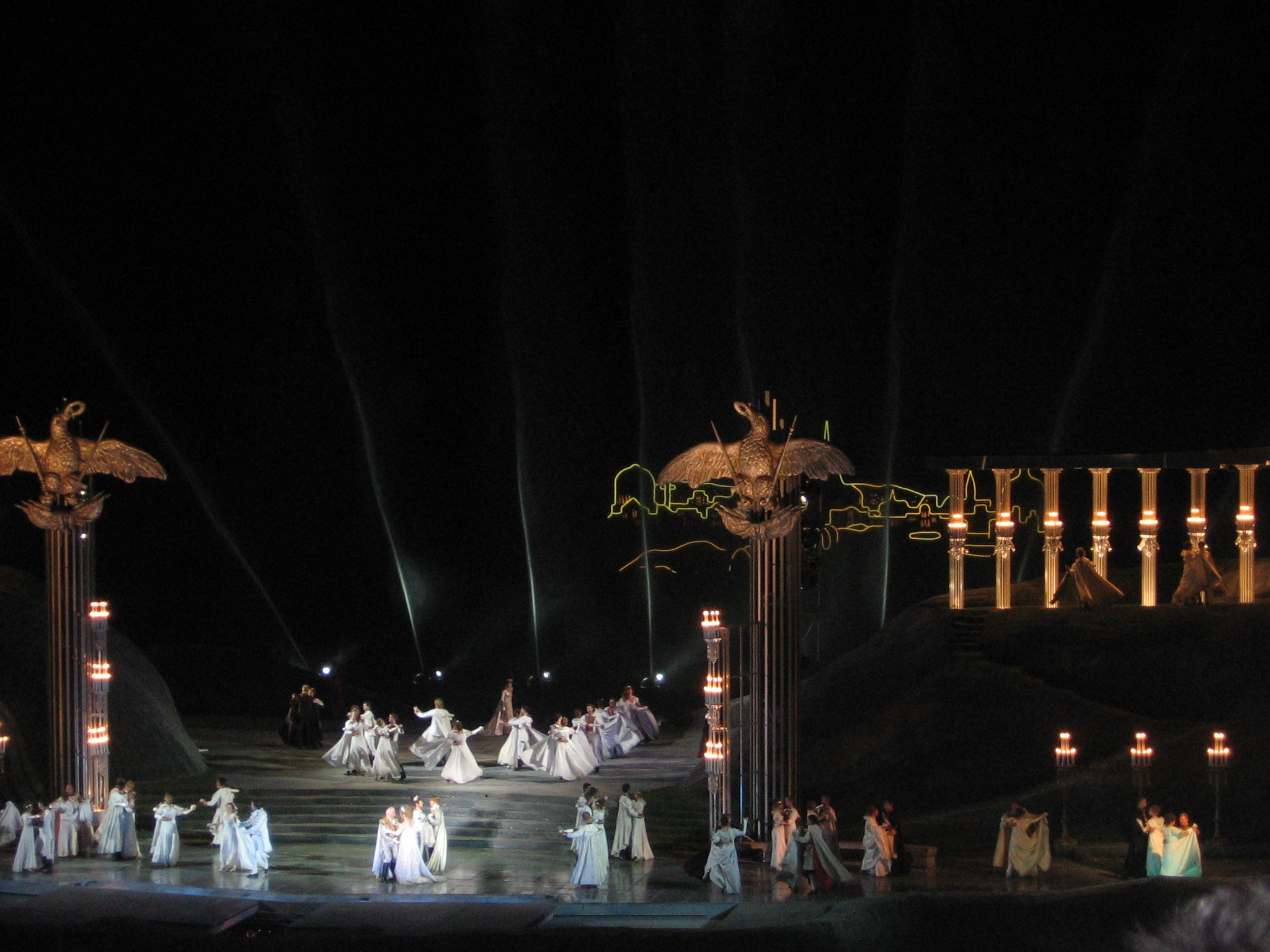
Premiere of Wiener Blut (2007)

=== Economic-touristic foundations ===
The creation and development of the Seespiele Mörbisch was dominated by considerations of tourism policy. When, from 1953 onwards, efforts were made to develop Burgenland's tourism and to transform the visiting and transit area into a place to stay and relax, Lake Neusiedl and the lakeside communities were at the centre of these efforts. In the municipality of Mörbisch am See, the road between Rust and Mörbisch was extended with strong support from the tourism department, an 1,800 m-long (5,900 ft) lake dam, which opened up Lake Neusiedl to visitors from Mörbisch, was built and a lido was constructed. Mörbisch became the fourth important tourist community on the lake, alongside Rust, Neusiedl am See and Podersdorf am See. In 1956, the people of Mörbisch invited to a two-day Seefest. Together with the Austrian National Tourist Office, the community organised a so-called Night and Lake Festival, which was attended by 6000 guests. The programme offered night rides in decorated motorboats, music was provided by dance bands, Viennese artists performed a complete cabaret programme, and folk song and dance groups also performed.

In 1957, the Burgenland press announced the first highlight of the development of Mörbisch into a Burgenland tourist centre through the construction of a lakeside hotel.. und der Abhaltung von Seespielen an und damit verbunden den Beginn eines neuen Abschnitts burgenländischen Wirtschafts- und Kulturaufstiegs.

=== Foundation, technical equipment ===
The initiative for the Seespiele, founded in the years 1955–1957, came from the celebrated chamber singer Herbert Alsen (among others) at the Vienna State Opera (1906–1978), who, together with his wife, the costume designer Gisela Bossert (†2012), who had worked in Berlin, discovered the venue by chance while looking for a holiday location that was climatically conducive to his voice, and whom the peculiar musicality of this landscape permanently touched. Alsen's plans found favour with the municipal council of Mörbisch as well as with the representative of the province, Landesrat Hans Bögl (1899–1974), especially as the project fitted into the tourism concept of the municipality and the province, and Alsen subsequently agreed to take over the directorship of the Seespiele for an initial period of five years (with reference to possible competition with the Bregenz Festivals), stressing that the Seespiele in Mörbisch did not want to be a festival that would add to the excessive number of festival venues.

After two years of preparation, the opening took place on 6 July 1957 with the operetta The Gypsy Baron by Johann Strauss II.

The lake stage was built in a bay next to the Mörbisch bathing beach on many hundreds of piles according to the plans of architect Ferry Windberger (1915–2008), the designer of the first Bregenz lake stage. Its dimensions were 42 by 20 m; the auditorium, created by filling in the lake, contained 1,500 (Note: Also: The auditorium offers space for 1,800 visitors. – See Mörbisch am See: New centre of tourism. The new lakeside hotel nears completion – 6 July: Opening of the Seespiele – Sacrifice and idealism at work.(...) Seespiele in Mörbisch. In Burgenländische Freiheit. vol. 27, no. 26, 1957, p. 3, column 3 centre.) Seating capacity. After an extension in 1959, 3000 people could be accommodated. Today the auditorium has over 6000 seats. In the following years, due to the great audience response, there were constant expansions, both in terms of the number of performances and the size of the auditorium and stage. From an initial six performances with about 7000 spectators (1957), the number increased to over 30 performances in July and August.

In 2006, a new sound system developed by the Fraunhofer Institute for Digital Media Technology and also in use at the Bregenz Festival was put into operation. This makes directional listening possible despite the size of the stage. For several years the premiere of the Seefestspiele was broadcast by the ORF. With the 2013 season, however, this practice was ended.

In 2018, specially staged performances for children were shown for the first time. A one-hour adaptation of Countess Mariza was shown in June 2018 on a stage set up on the festival grounds for a total of six performances. Up to 250 children were seated at each performance, and visitors were also given the opportunity to sing and dance along. The aim was to bring operetta closer to the children. The same soloists were on stage as in the regular performances. As part of the Österreichischer Musiktheaterpreis 2020, the Seefestspiele received the prize for the best youth and children's musical theatre production for Land of Smiles for Children.

=== Director of the Mörbisch Lake Festival since its foundation ===
- 1957–1978: Herbert Alsen (intendant), Franziska Schurli (December 1919, 21 January 1984) (managing Director)
- 1979–1980: Fred Liewehr (artistic director), Franziska Schurli (managing director)
- 1981–1983: Franziska Schurli (artistic director and managing director)
- 1984–1989: Robert Herzl (artistic director) Heinrich Meyer (managing director)
- 1990–1992: Rudolf Buczolich (intendant), Josef Wiedenhofer (managing director).
- 1993–2012: Harald Serafin (artistic director), Dietmar Posteiner (managing director).
- 2013–2017: Dagmar Schellenberger (artistic director), Dietmar Posteiner (managing director)
- since 2018: Peter Edelmann. (artistic director), Dietmar Posteiner (managing director), since 2021 additionally Alfons Haider as general music director of Burgenland.

From 1995 to 2008, Rudolf Bibl was musical director, and was appointed honorary member of the festival in 2013.

== Performances, artists ==
=== Performances ===
With a total of twelve seasons, The Gypsy Baron is by far the most frequently performed operetta in Mörbisch.

Year	Operetta / * Musical	Composer	Direction
1957 (Note: Of eight intended performances, two were cancelled due to bad weather. The performances began at 7 pm. The ticket prices were 10 Austrian shilling,- (0,73 Euro) to 50,- (3,63 Euro).) and 1958	The Gypsy Baron	Johann Strauss II	Fritz Diestel bzw. Erwin Euller
1958	Eine Nacht in Venedig	Johann Strauss II	Fritz Diestel bzw. Heinz Lambrecht
1959 and 1960	The Gypsy Baron	Johann Strauss II	Ernst Pichler
1959	Gräfin Mariza	Emmerich Kálmán	Alfred Walter
1960	Viktoria und ihr Husar	Paul Abraham	Kurt Pscherer
1961	Die Csárdásfürstin	Emmerich Kálmán	Kurt Pscherer
1962	The Gypsy Baron	Johann Strauss II	Karl Heinz Krahl
1963	Gasparone	Carl Millöcker	Otto Ambros
1964	Die lustige Witwe	Franz Lehár	Otto Fritz
1965	Die Blume von Hawaii	Paul Abraham	Otto Fritz
1966	The Gypsy Baron	Johann Strauss II	András Mikó
1967	Venus in Seid	Robert Stolz	Karl Heinz Haberland
1968	Gräfin Mariza	Emmerich Kálmán	András Mikó
1969	Der Bettelstudent	Carl Millöcker	Hermann Wedekind
1970	Die ungarische Hochzeit	Nico Dostal	Kurt Pscherer
1971	Die Csárdásfürstin	Emmerich Kálmán	Kurt Pscherer
1972	Eine Nacht in Venedig	Johann Strauss II	Otto Fritz
1973	Viktoria und ihr Husar	Paul Abraham	Rolf Kutschera
1974	Der Vogelhändler	Carl Zeller	Karl Dönch
1975	The Gypsy Baron	Johann Strauss II	András Mikó
1976	Das Land des Lächelns	Franz Lehár	Karl Dönch
1977	Maske in Blau	Fred Raymond	Robert Herzl (theatre director)
1978	Die Zirkusprinzessin	Emmerich Kálmán	Robert Herzl
1979	Gräfin Mariza	Emmerich Kálmán	Kurt Pscherer
1980	Die Fledermaus	Johann Strauss II	Kurt Pscherer
1981	The Gypsy Baron	Johann Strauss II	Glado von May
1982	Ein Walzertraum	Oscar Straus	Robert Herzl
1983	Die gold’ne Meisterin	Edmund Eysler	Robert Herzl
1984	Die Zirkusprinzessin	Emmerich Kálmán	Kurt Huemer
1985	Im weißen Rößl	Ralph Benatzky	Robert Herzl
1986	The Gypsy Baron	Johann Strauss II	Robert Herzl
1987	Gräfin Mariza	Emmerich Kálmán	Robert Herzl
1988	Eine Nacht in Venedig	Johann Strauss II	Robert Herzl
1989	Das Land des Lächelns	Franz Lehár	Otto Fritz
1990	Die Csárdásfürstin	Emmerich Kálmán	Sándor Nemeth
1991	Sissi und Romy	Roland Baumgartner	Edwin Zbonek
1992	The Gypsy Baron	Johann Strauss II	Wilfried Steiner
1993	Die lustige Witwe	Franz Lehár	Michael Maurer
1994	Wiener Blut	Johann Strauss II	Alexander Waechter
1995	Der Bettelstudent	Carl Millöcker	Winfried Bauernfeind
1996	Die Fledermaus	Johann Strauss II	Elmar Ottenthal
1997	Pariser Leben	Jacques Offenbach	Alain Marcel
1998	Der Vogelhändler	Carl Zeller	Winfried Bauernfeind
1999	Eine Nacht in Venedig	Johann Strauss II	Helmuth Lohner
2000	The Gypsy Baron	Johann Strauss II	Heinz Marecek
2001	Das Land des Lächelns	Franz Lehár	Winfried Bauernfeind
2002	Die Csárdásfürstin	Emmerich Kálmán	Helmuth Lohner
2003	Giuditta	Franz Lehár	Gernot Friedel
2004	Gräfin Mariza	Emmerich Kálmán	Winfried Bauernfeind
2005	Die lustige Witwe	Franz Lehár	Helmuth Lohner
2006	Der Graf von Luxemburg	Franz Lehár	Dietmar Pflegerl
2007	Wiener Blut	Johann Strauss II	Maximilian Schell
2008	Im weißen Rößl	Ralph Benatzky	Karl Absenger
2009	My Fair Lady	Frederick Loewe	Helmuth Lohner
2010	Der Zarewitsch	Franz Lehár	Peter Lund
2011	The Gypsy Baron	Johann Strauss II	Brigitte Fassbaender
2012	Die Fledermaus	Johann Strauss II	Helmuth Lohner
2013	Der Bettelstuden	Carl Millöcker	Ralf Nürnberger
2014	Anatevka	Jerry Bock	Karl Absenger
2015	Eine Nacht in Venedig	Johann Strauss II	Karl Absenger
2016	Viktoria und ihr Husar	Paul Abraham	Andreas Gergen
2017	Der Vogelhändler	Carl Zeller	Axel Köhler
2018	Gräfin Mariza	Emmerich Kálmán	Karl Absenger
2019	Das Land des Lächelns	Franz Lehár	Leonard Prinsloo
2021	West Side Story	Leonard Bernstein	Werner Sobotka
2022	The King and I	Richard Rodgers	Simon Eichenberger
2023	Mamma Mia!	Benny Andersson & Björn Ulvaeus	Andreas Gergen
2024	My Fair Lady	Frederick Loewe	Simon Eichenberger
2025	Saturday Night Fever	Robert Stigwood & Bill Oakes	Karl Absenger
2026	La Cage aux Folles	Jerry Herman	Andreas Gergen

The 2020 Festival had to be cancelled due to the COVID-19 pandemic in Austria. The production of West Side Story planned for 2020 was postponed to 2021. The stage decoration includes a 14 m-high (46 ft) Statue of Liberty and the typical Manhattan brick buildings with fire escape, water elevator and neon advertising sign Nylon on the roof.

=== Artists who have performed so far ===
- Marina Alsen, 1964, 1967, 2015
- Anja-Nina Bahrmann, 2006
- Sari Barabas, 1960, 1961, 1964, 1967
- Rosy Barsony, 1967
- [Verena Barth-Jurca, 2015, 2016
- Erwin Belakowitsch, 2013, 2014
- Helmut Berger-Tuna, 1998, 2000
- Rupert Bergmann, 2013, 2014
- Alfred Böhm, 1977, 1982
- Henryk Böhm, 2013
- Kurt Böhme, 1975
- Christian Boesch, 1969
- Jochen Brockmann, 1976
- Rudolf Carl, 1959, 1964, 1968
- Heinz Conrads, 1971
- Rudolf Christ, 1967, 1968
- Dorothea Chryst, 1974
- Ciro de Luca, 2010
- Karl Dönch, 1974, 1978, 1979, 1980
- Rui dos Santos, 2013, 2016
- Nigel Douglas. 1964
- Felix Dvorak, 1978, 1981
- Peter Edelmann, 1996
- Gerhard Ernst, 1991, 2004, 2014, 2017
- Heinz Ehrenfreund, 1976, 1980
- Richard Eybner, 1975
- Sieglinde Feldhofer, 2010, 2012, 2017
- Rainhard Fendrich, 2008
- Günther Frank, 1972, 1973
- Harry Friedauer, 1959
- Gail Gilmore, 1979, 1981
- Franz Glawatsch jun., 1957, 1958, 1959
- Walter Goldschmidt, 1970, 1971, 1972, 1974, 1975
- Hugo Gottschlich, 1978, 1979
- Kurt Großkurth, 1970, 1971
- Ingrid Habermann, 1999, 2013, 2014
- Harry Hardt, 1976
- Johannes Heesters, 1973
- Robert Herzl), 1974
- Sylvia Holzmayer, 1977
- Kurt Huemer, 1977, 1978, 1979
- Mirjana Irosch, 1976, 1980, 1981, 1987, 1993, 1995, 2005
- Gundula Janowitz, 1987
- Peter Josch, 1979
- Elisabeth Kales, 1982, 1985, 1986, 1989, 1993
- Marko Kathol, 2004, 2006, 2010
- Waldemar Kmentt, 1980
- Dagmar Koller, 1977, 1982, 1985
- Ossy Kolmann, 1974, 1976, 1988
- Johannes Martin Kränzle, 1995
- Horst Lamnek, 2017, 2018
- Peter Lesiak 2016
- Marika Lichter, 1998
- Fred Liewehr, 1977
- Herbert Lippert, 1994, 2012, 2015
- Helmuth Lohner, 2009, 2012
- Guggi Löwinger, 1960, 1970, 1971, 1973
- Mark Roy Luykx, 2021
- Michael Maertens, 2009
- Sigrid Martikke, 1973, 1974, 1975
- Iva Mihanovic, 2007
- Peter Minich, 1974, 1976, 1978
- Corneliu Murgu, 1980
- Nera Nicol, 1973
- Klaus Ofczarek, 1969
- Helga Papouschek, 1965, 1976, 1978
- Stephan Paryla, 2003, 2014
- Barbara Payha, 1997
- Olaf Plassa, 2013, 2014
- Linda Plech, 2011, 2013
- Herbert Prikopa, 1958, 1988, 1991, 1992
- Joesi Prokopetz, 2015
- Elena Puszta, 2015, 2017
- Else Rambausek, 1959, 1961, 1963
- Sebastian Reinthaller, 1998
- Elfriede Ramhapp, 1958, 1974
- Alexandra Reinprecht, 2010, 2012
- Mirko Roschkowski, 2013, 2015
- Helge Rosvaenge, 1958
- Lotte Rysanek, 1958
- Johannes Schauer, 1980
- Dagmar Schellenberger, 2004, 2005, 2014, 2015, 2016, 2017
- Vera Schoenenberg, 2002
- Marianne Schönauer, 1970, 1989, 1990
- Ingeborg Schöpf, 2008
- Gretl Schörg, 1976
- Margit Schramm, 1971
- Nikolai Schukoff, 2004
- Friedrich-W. Schwardtmann, 2003, 2007, 2010
- Paul Schweinester, 2017
- Daniel Serafin, 2007, 2009, 2011, 2012
- Harald Serafin, 1969, 2012
- Martina Serafin, 1994, 1995, 1997, 1998, 2000
- Tiberius Simu, 2010
- Franziska Stanner, 2013, 2014
- Ulrike Steinsky, 1988, 1989, 1994
- Rudolf Strobl, 1978
- Ernst-Dieter Suttheimer, 1981, 2015
- Helga Thieme, 1980
- Maria Tiboldi, 1972
- Vico Torriani, 1972
- Jeffrey Traganza, 2015, 2016
- Natalia Ushakova, 2003
- Ljuba Welitsch, 1969, 1970, 1971
- Vida Mikneviciute, 2018
- Karl Winkler, 1957
- Roman Payer, 2018
- Andreja Zidaric, 2021
- Grete Zimmer, 1978, 1979

== Notes and references ==
=== References ===
Sources

- Maria Awecker, Sabine Schmall, Heinz Hischenhuber (ed.), Margret Dietrich (ed.): Theatergeschichte des Burgenlandes von 1921 bis zur Gegenwart. Theatergeschichte Österreichs, vol. 8: Burgenland, fascicule 2, ZDB-ID 570996-9. Österreichischen Akademie der Wissenschaften Press, Vienna 1995, ISBN 3-7001-2208-X– table of content (PDF).
