= Margarethe Düren =

German operatic soprano

Margarete Düren
- Born: 24 September 1904; Magdeburg, German Empire
- Died: c. 1988; Cologne, West Germany
- Other name: Margarethe Düren-Herrmann
- Occupation: Operatic soprano
- Organizations: Staatsoper Stuttgart; Semperoper; Cologne Opera

Margarete Düren or Margarethe Düren-Herrmann (24 September 1904 – c. 1988) was a German operatic soprano. She was based at the Staatsoper Stuttgart until 1939, where she appeared in the world premiere of Nico Dostal's operetta Monika, in the title role. With her husband Josef Herrmann she moved on to the Semperoper in Dresden and further to Berlin. They appeared and recorded together. After his death, she moved to Cologne, where she served as a prompter until age 89.

== Life and career ==
Düren was born in Magdeburg. After voice studies, she worked at Theater Chemnitz, first as a chorus member, then as soloist. She was engaged at the Würzburg municipal theatre from 1933 to 1935, then at the Theater Königsberg until 1937, and at the Staatsoper Stuttgart until 1939, where she appeared in the title role of Dostal's operetta Monika in its world premiere. She married the baritone Josef Herrmann, who made a career at the Semperoper in Dresden and after World War II at the Städtische Oper Berlin. They often performed together, for example in Mozart's Le nozze di Figaro and in Lortzing's Undine, also in recordings.

She was engaged at the Volksoper Dresden after World War II, in 1946 and 1947. Her key roles included Mozart's Blonde in Die Entführung aus dem Serail and Susanna in Le nozze di Figaro, the title roles in Puccini's Madama Butterfly and Smetana's Die verkaufte Braut, Adele in Die Fledermaus by Johann Strauss, Lortzing's Marie in both Zar und Zimmermann and Der Waffenschmied, and Nedda in Leoncavallo's Pagliacci.

After her husband's death, she moved to Cologne, where she worked as a prompter at the Cologne Opera until age 89.

She died in Cologne.

== Recordings ==
Düren recorded five duets with her husband, and a trio from Der Zigeunerbaron by J. Strauss.

- ABC der Gesangskunst in Deutschland. Part 1. (recordings: 1927–1949). Line Music, Hamburg 2002, DNB-IDN 358191521.
- Willy Treffner. (recordings: 1939–1943; Gesamttitel: Lebendige Vergangenheit), Preiser, Vienna 2001, DNB-IDN 35896718X.
