= Intermezzo (opera) =

1924 opera by Richard Strauss

- Opera by Richard Strauss
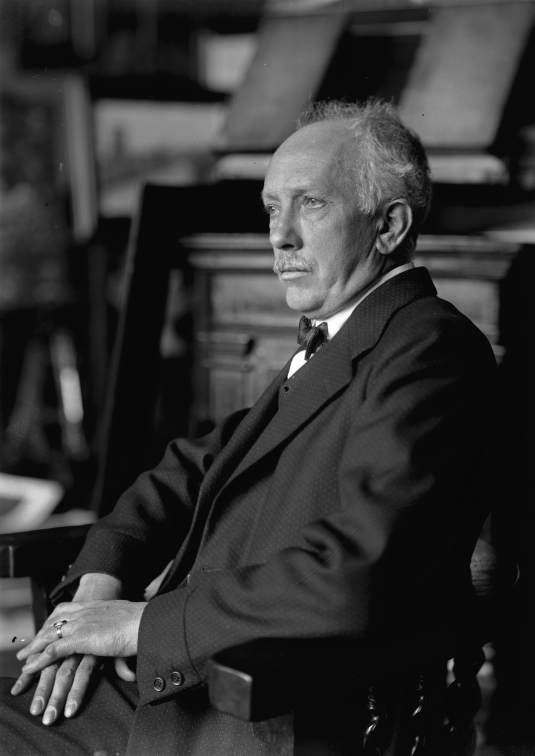
- Strauss in 1922
- Librettist: Richard Strauss
- Language: German
- Premiere: 4 November 1924; Semperoper, Dresden

Intermezzo, Op. 72, is a comic opera in two acts by Richard Strauss to his own German libretto, described as a Bürgerliche Komödie mit sinfonischen Zwischenspielen (bourgeois comedy with symphonic interludes). It premiered at the Dresden Semperoper on 4 November 1924, with sets that reproduced Strauss' home in Garmisch. The first Vienna performance was in January 1927.

== Background ==
The story depicts fictionally the personalities of Strauss himself (as "Robert Storch") and his wife Pauline (as "Christine") and was based on real incidents in their lives. Pauline Strauss was not aware of the opera's subject before the first performance. After Lotte Lehmann had congratulated Pauline on this "marvelous present to you from your husband", Pauline's reply was reported as "I don't give a damn". The most celebrated excerpts from the opera are the orchestral interludes between scenes.

His usual librettist up to that time, Hugo von Hofmannsthal, refused to work on the opera and suggested that Strauss himself write the libretto, which he eventually did after having been refused by other writers. This is why the libretto is not in verse but in prose and even mimics the dialect used by the servants in the play, against the more polished German of the principals.

The opera's title is intended to refer to the intermezzi that used to be staged during the intermissions of serious operas during the 18th century, sort of mini-comic-operas, easy to follow with themes usually about marital confusions and other light comedies.

== Performance history ==
The UK premiere was at the Glyndebourne Opera on 15 June 1974 (sung in English), with subsequent productions in 1975 and 1983 (with a BBC Broadcast on 26 August 1983).

The first professional staged US production was at the Santa Fe Opera in 1984, translated into English.

== Roles ==
Role	Voice type	Premiere cast, 4 November 1924 Conductor: Fritz Busch
Christine Storch	soprano	Lotte Lehmann
Robert Storch, her husband, a conductor	baritone	Joseph Correck
Anna, their maid	soprano	Liesel v. Schuch
Franzl, their eight-year-old son	spoken	Fritz Sonntag
Baron Lummer	tenor	Theo Strack
The notary	baritone	Robert Büssel
His wife	soprano	Elfriede Haberkorn
Stroh, another conductor	tenor	Hanns Lange
A commercial counselor	baritone	Ludwig Ermold
A legal counsellor	baritone	Adolph Schoepflin
A singer	bass	Willy Bader
Fanny, the Storch's cook	spoken	Anna Bolze
Marie and Therese, maids	spoken	Erna Frese
Resi, a young girl	soprano	

== Synopsis ==
Setting: Vienna and Grundlsee during a 1920s winter

The composer Storch is leaving for a conducting tour, and his wife Christine helps him pack, arguing and nagging along the way. Seeking relief from loneliness she goes tobogganing and collides with a skier, a young Baron who befriends her. They dance together at a ball and she arranges for him to lodge in her notary's house. The friendship sours when the Baron asks Christine for financial assistance. She opens a letter, supposedly for her husband, from a lady arranging an assignation. She immediately telegrams Storch demanding they part forever. In tears, she seeks solace in her son's bedroom, but he defends his father.

Storch is playing skat with friends in Vienna when the telegram arrives and is bewildered by the accusations. Stroh, a conductor friend, admits that he knows the lady and surmises that his and Storch's surnames must have been confused. Christine visits the notary to demand a divorce, but he is unwilling to pursue the matter. She sends the Baron to Vienna to gather evidence of infidelity. Packing to leave, she receives a telegram from her husband saying that Stroh will explain the misunderstanding. Even after Stroh's visit she is reluctant to accept the truth. Storch returns home, and an argument ensues. The Baron arrives with evidence that Stroh rather than Storch had known the lady and Christine dismisses him, assured that her husband is blameless. Storch forgives her anger and teases her about her dalliance with the Baron. Husband and wife declare a renewed love.

== Instrumentation ==
Strauss scored Intermezzo for the following orchestra:

- Woodwinds: 2 flutes (flute 2 doubles piccolo), 2 oboes (oboe 2 doubles English Horn), 2 clarinets in B-flat (clarinet 2 doubles bass clarinet in A), 2 bassoons (2nd bassoon must play low A in act 2)
- Brass: 3 horns (in F, E, D, E-flat, and A), 2 trumpets (in C), 2 trombones
- Percussion: timpani, suspended cymbals, crash cymbals, snare drum, triangle, bass drum, pair of [sleigh] bells
- Keyboards: piano, harmonium
- Strings: harp, violins I (11), violins II (9), violas (5), violoncelli (5), contrabasses (3)

== Recordings ==
Year	Cast: Christine Storch, Robert Storch, Anna, Baron Lummer	Conductor, opera house and orchestra	Label
1954	Hilde Zadek, Alfred Poell, Anny Felbermayer, Rudolf Christ	Rudolf Moralt; Vienna State Opera Orchestra, 30 March at the Theater an der Wien	Omega Opera Archive 538
1963	Hanny Steffek, Hermann Prey, Gertrud Freedman, Ferry Gruber	Joseph Keilberth, Bavarian State Opera Orchestra and Chorus	VHS Video Cassette: Lyric Distribution (Legato); Cat: 1818; DVD: Legato Classics
1980	Lucia Popp, Dietrich Fischer-Dieskau, Gabriele Fuchs, Adolf Dallapozza	Wolfgang Sawallisch, Bavarian Radio Symphony Orchestra	CD: EMI Classics; Cat: 7 49337-2
1983	Felicity Lott, John Pringle, Elizabeth Gale, Ian Caley	Gustav Kuhn, London Philharmonic Orchestra	VHS / DVD?: Kultur] Cat: CVI 2024
2014	Simone Schneider, Markus Eiche, Martina Welschenbach, Martin Homrich, Brigitte Fassbaender (speaking roles)	Ulf Schirmer, Münchner Rundfunkorchester	CD: Classic Produktion Osnabrück, Cat: 7779012
2024	Maria Bengtsson, Philipp Jekal, Anna Schoeck, Thomas Blondelle	Donald Runnicles, Orchester der Deutschen Oper Berlin	CD: Naxos, Cat: 8.660584-85
