= Julia Gomelskaya =

Ukrainian composer

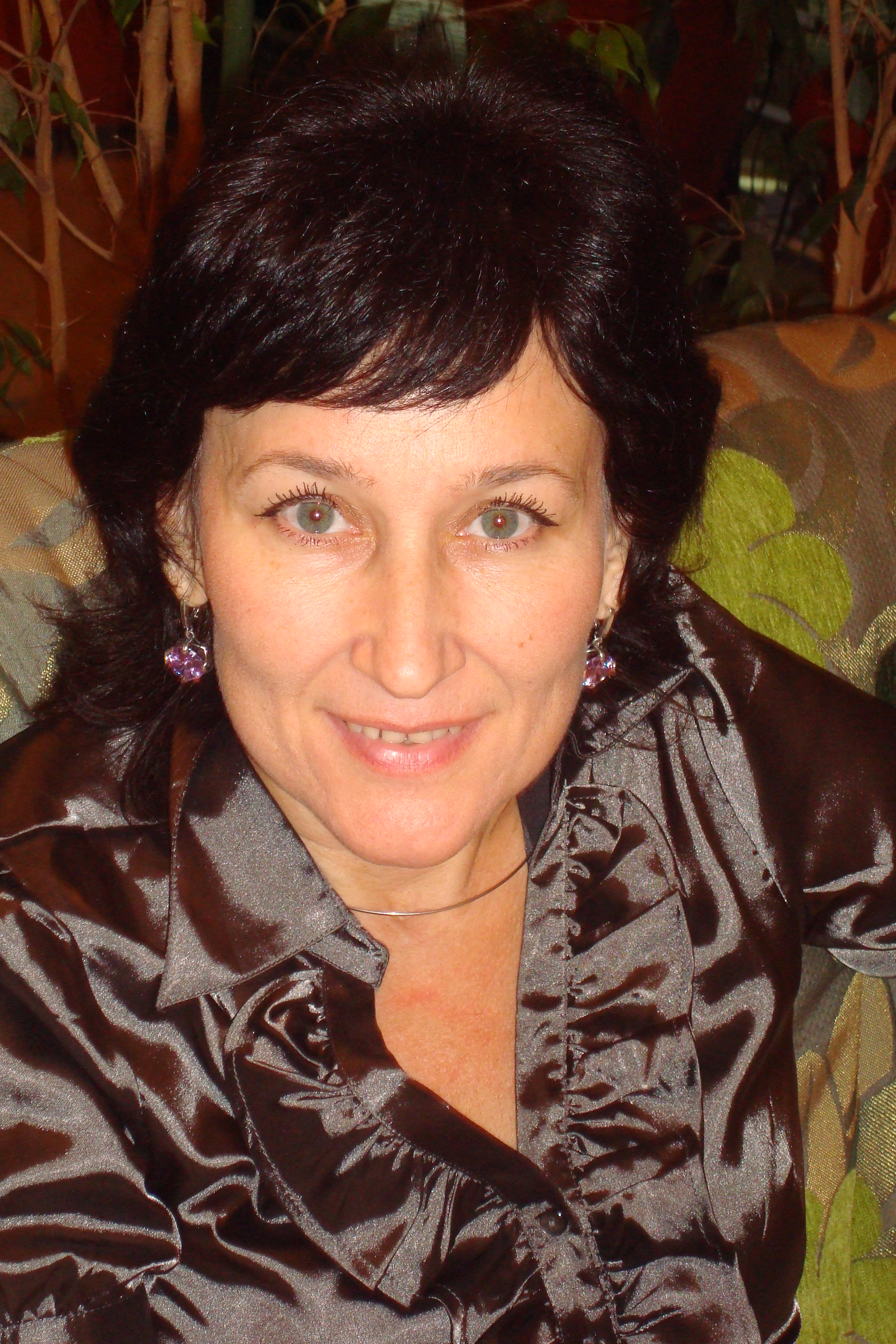
Julia Gomelskaya

Julia Gomelskaya (Russian: Юлия Александровна Гомельская, Ukrainian: Юлія Олександрівна Гомельська; 11 March 1964 – 4 December 2016) was a Ukrainian composer of contemporary classical music.

== Biography ==
Gomelskaya graduated from the Simpheropol Tchaikovsky Musical College as a pianist and studied composition under Oleksandr Krasotov at the Odessa National A.V.Nezhdanova Music Academy (Ukraine), where she went on to become a professor of composition. In 1994 Gomelskaya participated at the Gaudeamus Foundation workshop (Amsterdam) with Ton de Leeuw and Nigel Osborne. Later she was awarded a fellowship by the Guildhall School of Music and Drama (London) for postgraduate study under Robert Saxton. In 1996 she received the MMus Degree in Composition with distinction validated from City University of London. She held a PhD in Music Art and composed symphonic, ballet, chamber and vocal music. She was a member of the National Ukrainian Composers' Union (Національна Спілка Композиторів України) and of the Ukraine section of ISCM.

Gomelskaya participated in international festivals in Ukraine and abroad including ISCM World Music Days (Zagreb 2011, Sweden 2009, Switzerland 2004, Hong Kong 2002, Luxembourg 2000), XXVI Festival "Trieste Prima" (Italy, 2012), Festival UNICUM in Ljubljana (Slovenia) 2012, 48 la Biennale di Venezia 2004, FMF Schweiz 2000, 2002, 2003, 2009 (Switzerland), Spitalfields Festival 1996, 1997, Opera and Theatre Lab 1996 and Mayfield Festival 2000 (UK). Her music has been performed at Wigmore Hall, Purcell Room (London, 1998, 2001, 2002), "Gran Teatre del Liceu"(Barcelona, 2002). In 2008 her ballet "Jane Eyre" was staged by London Children's Ballet at the Peacock Theatre, London.

Gomelskaya died in a car accident on 4 December 2016 at the age of 52.

== Awards ==
- the 1st prize at the 2nd International Composition Contest of Comines (Belgium, 2003),
- the 1st prize at the 35th Concours International de Chant Choral Florilege de Tours, France, 2006.
- Laureate of the Boris Liatoshyns’kyj Prize ru:Лятошинский, Борис Николаевич (Лятошинский Борис Николаевич) of the Ukrainian Ministry for Culture and Arts (2011).
- Laureate of Odessa Municipal Prize 2006.

== List of works ==
Data from the official website

2016

- "Aura lucis" Concert-Symphony for violin and symphony orchestra (2.0.2.1\4.3.3.1\3 perc.\harp\strings)
- "Ra-Aeternae" Symphony N4 for symphony orchestra

2015

- “DiaDem-Julia” for two violins

2014

- "Magnet" Symphony №3 for symphony orchestra (picc.2.2.2.2\4.3.3.1\3 perc.\harp\strings)
- "Jessenin-Pastelle" for bass-baritone, bayan and piano, poems by Sergej Jessenin (in German)
- «Planet «Life» for string orchestra and piano
- Two songs for female choir on folk Ukrainian texts: “Lulli vid Yuli” (lullaby) and “Kucheriava Kateryna”
- «Warm rain» («DiaDem-Domra» (N5) for domra and piano
- «Меrezhyvo-zhyve» for three banduras

2013

- "Alleluia Festivo" for female choir
- “DiaDem-Viva-Di” (N4) for bayan and piano
- "Trace of…" version for violin and piano
- "Trace of…" version for violoncello and piano

2012

- "Three Ascents to the Identity" for chamber ensemble (flute, clarinet, viola, violoncello, trombone, piano and percussion)
- "Major-Major" for brass quintet (2Trpts.Hrn.Trne.Tuba)
- "in the stream of pulsed Lyra" Chamber symphony for string orchestra (Vn9.Va3.Vc3.Db1)

2011

- “Vyjdy, vyjdy, Ivanku” transcription of folk song for brass quintet
- “Vyjdy, vyjdy, Ivanku” transcription of folk song for trumpet quintet
- “Vyjdy, vyjdy, Ivanku” transcription of folk song for wind quintet
- "Winter pastoral" for trumpet quintet
- "Writing to Onegin. One more try" version for female voice, viola, cello, marimba and harp, poems by Ruth Padel (in English)
- "Writing to Onegin. One more try" for female voice and cello, poems by Ruth Padel (in English)

2010

- SYMPHONY #2 “Ukraine Forever” for symphony orchestra (picc.2.2.2.2\4.3.3.1\3 perc.\pno\harp\strings)
- Flashbacks Of a Tired Popstar novels for bass-baritone, violin and piano, poems by Karl Maria Kinsky (in English, German)
- Wings of East Wind for flute, clarinet, violin, violoncello and piano
- “DiaDem” N3 for bandura and bajan

2009

- Concerto grosso for violin and string orchestra
- Ukrainian Ballad for soprano and tuba

2008

- “Trace of Trumpet” for trumpet and piano
- “Charms of a Lonely Fiery Bird or Well Digitized Bandoura” for bandura and electronics
- Jab-Jazz for trombone, piano and 1 percussion player

2007

- Concerto for piano and string orchestra
- “AtomAnatomy” for cl, bass-cl, soprano-sax, alto-sax, 1 perc. player, p-no, acc-n, two v-ns, v-la, v-c and d-bass
- “Strimellata -Sounds” Сhamber Symphony for flute, oboe, clarinet, bassoon, horn, two violins, viola, cello and double-bass
- “the only hint…” for clarinet in B

2006

- “Through Crystals of Gothic Mosaic” for flute\alto-flute, violoncello, piano
- “Calling the Sun” for 2 pianos
- “O Vstrechnom”-message for piano
- “Vyjdy, vyjdy, Ivanku” transcription of folk song for mixed choir(SATB),(in Ukrainian)
- “Gutsulka Dance” version for 2 pianos and 2 percussion players
- “Gutsulka Dance” for piano and one percussion player
- “Whispering, speaking, singing…” for mixed choir (SATB)(in English, in Ukrainian)

2005

- “Ukrajinochka” for piano
- “dive deep in a rhythm-risk-riot…” for violin, violoncello and piano
- “Rhythmus” version for cello and piano
- “Rhythmus” for double bass and piano

2004

- “My Sister-night” for mezzo, flute\alto-flute, piano poems by Dollie Radford (in English)
- “SymPhoBia” symphony for orchestra

2003

- "Winter Pastoral" version for vocal quartet, verses by Boris Pasternak, translation by L.Pasternak-Slater (in English)
- “DiaDem” N2 for violin and cello
- “DiaDem” for flute and piano
- “the only hint…” for flute solo
- “Carl & Clara" for clarinet and piano

2002

- “Vitae Musica” (concert of symbols) for mixed choir and piano(2 players), poems by Roman Brodavko (in Ukrainian, in English)
- “EcHorn” for horn player and piano

2001

- “Out of Gravitation” for soprano, flute\alto-flute and piano, poems by Gwyneth Lewis (in English)
- “The Riot” for big wind ensemble, version for wind symphony orchestra
- “The Triumph of Adrenaline” for trombone and percussion
- "DiaDem” for flute and harp
- “Barva” for bandura solo

2000

- “The Trap for two” for saxophones soprano and alto
- “…herbarium…music of recalls…” for violin, viola, cello
- “Behind the Shadow of Sound” for violin and bayan
- “Dabuba-Pa” for violin solo

1999

- "The Divine Sarah" opera-scene for mezzo-soprano and piano, libretto by Michael Irwin (in English)
- "Synopsis of Symmetries" for flute, violin, viola & cello
- “Seven Touches” for piano

1998

- "Zig-Net-Zag" for clarinet/bass clarinet, cello and two pianos
- "Ithron-phonium" for symphony orchestra

1997

- "Jane Eyre" ballet for small symphonic orchestra
- "From the Bottom of the Soul" string quartet
- "Waiting" for mezzo-soprano and piano, verses by Jennie Fontana (in English)

1996

- "Memento Vitae" for small symphony orchestra
- "FLUTE VER-INVERSIONS" for flute and tape
- "KURT-REMINISCENCES" for wind orchestra
- "TEAR-STAINED AUTUMN" for soprano and piano, verses by Anna Akhmatova (in Russian)
- "SENTIMENTAL SERENADE" for bassoon and piano
- "BAGATELLE" for horn and piano
- "WINTER PASTORAL" for choir a cappella, verses by Boris Pasternak (in English)
- "FORGOTTEN RITUAL" for chamber ensemble

1995

- "N-QUARTET" for string quartet
- "DIPHONIUM" for ten instruments
- "FLORIDAS" for small symphony orchestra
- ”PHONIUM-FOLK" for flute, violin, cello and piano

1994

- "SAXONOME.APOLOGIA" for alto-saxophone and ensemble
- "UNWHISPERED WORDS" chamber cantata for soprano, flute and piano, verses by Olena Matushek(in Ukrainian)

1993

- "EXLIBRIS" for violin and symphony orchestra
- "SPRING VERSES" chamber cantata for children's choir, violin, percussion and piano(in Ukrainian)

1992

- "IN MODO SKETCH" for cello and piano

1990

- "POEM-OVERTURE" for symphony orchestra

1989

- "IN OPPOSITION" string quartet
- Fantasia on themes of "Porge and Bess" opera by George Gershwin for violin, cello and piano

1988

- "SHOUT" chamber cantata for baritone, violin, cello and piano, prose by Yurij Bondarev (in Russian)

1987

- Sonata for violin and piano

=== Commissions ===
Her commissions include:

- the ballet Jane Eyre for the London Children's Ballet which received its first performance at the Wimbledon Theatre (London) in May 1997
- From the Bottom of the Soul string quartet for the Spitalfields Festival 1997 (London) for the Yggdrasil Quartet
- Waiting for British mezzo-soprano Sarah Walker and Malcolm Martineau for the Wigmore Hall 1997/98 season in London
- The Divine Sarah opera-scene for British mezzo-soprano Sarah Walker for the Mayfield Festival 2000
- Zig-Net-Zag for the Ensemble Klangheimlich for the concert programmes for 1999 in Berne and Zurich (Switzerland)
- Seven Touches for piano for Franziska Rieder, 2000 (Switzerland)
- The Riot for the Guildhall School of Music and Drama wind orchestra by BASBWE Education Trust for the British Music Academies Festival 2001 (London, UK)
- Out of Gravitation (2002) for Amaltea Ensemble (Switzerland)
- The hint only... for Mario Caroli for Spaziomusica Festival 2003 (Italy)
- Winter Pastoral (2004) for Vox Vocal Quartet (Sweden)
- My sister-night (2004) for Amaltea Ensemble (Switzerland)
- Through Crystals of Gothic Mozaic (2006) for Amaltea Ensemble (Switzerland)
- Strimpellata-Sounds chamber symphony (2007) for La Strimpellata Ensemble (Switzerland)
- ukRAINian BALLAD (2008) for Franziska Welti and Leo Bachmann (Switzerland)
- Trace of Trumpet (2008) for the "V International Myron Starovetskyi Competition for young trumpeters "Competition trumpeters" (Ukraine)
- Flashbacks of a Tired Popstar (2010) for Rupert Bergmann (Austria)
- Writing to Onegin. One More Try (2011) for female voice and cello for Franziska Welti and Moritz Müllenbach (Switzerland)
- Three Ascents to the Identity (2012) for chamber ensemble for MD7 Ensemble for Festival UNICUM (Ljubljana, Slovenia, 2012) and XXVI Festival “Trieste Prima” (Italy, 2012)
