= Clivia (disambiguation) =

Clivia is a genus of flowering plants.

Clivia may also refer to:

- Clivia (apple), a German apple cultivar
- Clivia (opera), German-language operetta by Nico Dostal
- Clivia (film), a 1954 West German musical film
- 935 Clivia, an asteroid
