= Manina =

Manina may refer to:

- Manina (opera), by Nico Dostal
- Manina, character in 1950 film September Affair
- Manina, the Girl in the Bikini 1952 French film directed by Willy Rozier and starring Brigitte Bardot, Jean-François Calvé and Howard Vernon
- Tamara Manina (born 1934), Soviet Olympic gymnast
- Manina, location in Congo-Brazzaville
- Manina Vlizianon, village in Greece

== See also ==
- "Che gelida manina" ("What frozen little hand"), aria from La bohème
