= Clivia (film) =

1954 film directed by Karl Anton

- Directed by: Karl Anton
- Written by: Karl Anton; Ernst Nebhut; Charles Amberg (libretto)
- Produced by: Waldemar Frank
- Starring: Claude Farell; Peter Pasetti; Paul Dahlke
- Cinematography: Karl Löb; Fritz Arno Wagner
- Edited by: Walter Wischniewsky
- Music by: Nico Dostal
- Production company: Central-Europa Film
- Distributed by: Prisma Film
- Release date: 10 August 1954
- Running time: 98 minutes
- Country: West Germany
- Language: German

Clivia is a 1954 West German musical film directed by Karl Anton and starring Claude Farell, Peter Pasetti and Paul Dahlke. It is an adaptation of the 1933 operetta Clivia by Nico Dostal and is part of the subgenre of operetta films. It was shot at the Spandau Studios in Berlin and on location in Mallorca. The film's sets were designed by the art directors Karl Weber and Erich Grave.

== Synopsis ==
In order for her revue troupe to be able to enter a South American country, singer Clivia marries a local cattle baron. However, it turns out that troupe's leader has plans to overthrow the country's president.

== Cast ==
- Claude Farell as Clivia
- Peter Pasetti as Juan
- Ulrich Beiger
- Paul Dahlke as Potterton
- Gerd Frickhöffer
- Paul Henckels as Valdivio
- Wolfgang Müller
- Charles Regnier
- Hans Richter
- Anneliese Rothenberger as Singer
- Hans Hermann Schaufuß
- Herta Staal
- Lisa Stammer
- Ruth Stephan
- Lou van Burg
- Egon Vogel
- Ewald Wenck
- Horst Wilhelm as Singer

== Bibliography ==
- Bock, Hans-Michael; Bergfelder, Tim, eds. (2009). The Concise Cinegraph: Encyclopaedia of German Cinema. New York: Berghahn Books. ISBN 978-1-57181-655-9.
