= Paul Armin Edelmann =

Austrian operatic baritone (born 1968)

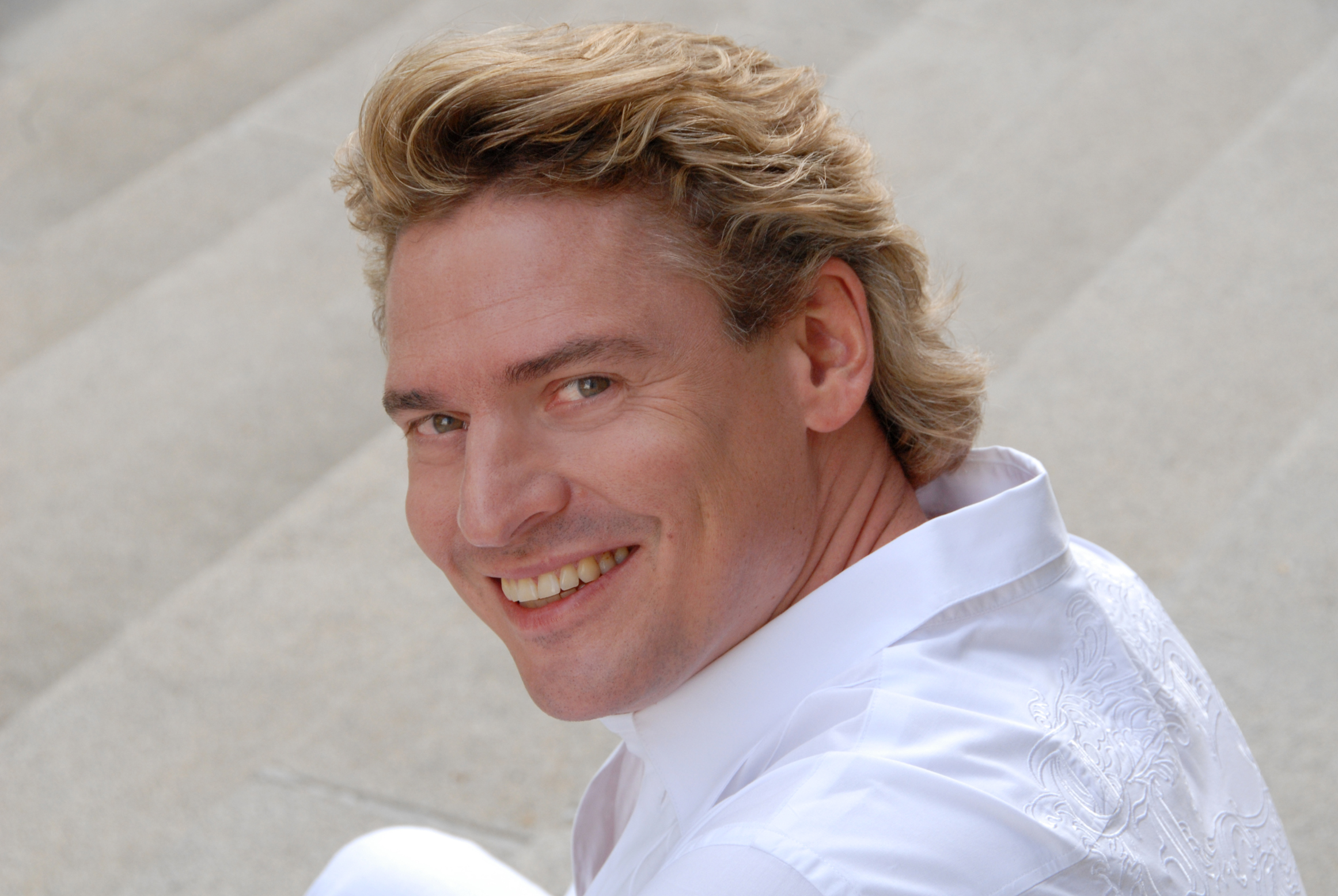
- Paul Armin Edelmann in 2009
- Born: 1968 (age 57–58); Vienna, Austria
- Education: Vienna Boys' Choir; University of Music and Performing Arts Vienna
- Occupation: Operatic baritone
- Father: Otto Edelmann
- Relatives: Peter Edelmann (brother)
- Website: paul-armin-edelmann.com

Paul Armin Edelmann (born 1968) is an Austrian operatic baritone. He received first musical training as a member of the Vienna Boys' Choir. After five years as an ensemble member at the Theater Koblenz, he has worked as a free-lance singer based in Vienna since 1997, appearing at major opera houses and festivals internationally, often together with his brother Peter Edelmann, also a baritone. Focused on Mozart roles such as Don Giovanni and Papageno, he also appeared at the Schwetzingen Festival in the world premiere of Salvatore Sciarrino's Luci mie traditrici.

== Life and career ==
=== Family and education ===
Born in Vienna, Edelmann is the younger son of the Austrian opera singer Otto Edelmann, and the brother of Peter Edelmann, also a baritone. He was a member of the Vienna Boys' Choir from 1978 to 1982, and studied voice from 1987 to 1992 at the University of Music and Performing Arts Vienna with his father.

=== Opera ===
Edelmann was first an ensemble member at the Theater Koblenz from 1992 to 1997, where he performed around 30 roles. In 1996, he performed, together with his brother Peter Edelmann, at the Seefestspiele Mörbisch. He appeared as Falke in Die Fledermaus by Johann Strauss, while his brother was Eisenstein. He returned to Vienna in 1998 and has since worked as a freelance singer. There, he performed at the Vienna State Opera as Papageno in Mozart's Die Zauberflöte, and at the Vienna Volksoper as Papageno and Falke.

In 1998, he performed at the Schwetzingen Festival in the world premiere of Salvatore Sciarrino's Luci mie traditrici. In 2002, he sang the role of Octave in Franz Lehár's Eva at the Stadttheater Klagenfurt. In 2009, he appeared in the title role of Mozart's Don Giovanni at the Dublin Opera House, while his brother appeared as Leporello.

He has made guest appearances at the Teatro Real in Madrid (as Papageno), at the Komische Oper Berlin (as Prince Ottokar in Der Freischütz) and at La Monnaie in Brussels (1999, as Doctor Malatesta in Don Pasquale). He has also made guest appearances at the Oper Frankfurt (as Guglielmo), at the Theater St. Gallen, (December 2008, debut as Danilo in The Merry Widow), at the Stadttheater Bern and at the Staatsoper Stuttgart (2010/11 season as Eisenstein). In the 2011/12 season, he sang the role of Eisenstein there again. Vita (Website of the Staatstheater Stuttgart; retrieved 5 August 2021) In 2012, he appeared at the Opéra national du Rhin as Papageno in Die Zauberflöte; in 2013 and 2014, he also sang this role at the Bregenz Festival. In January 2017, he gave a guest performance in Beijing at the National Centre for the Performing Arts as Count Danilo Danilovich in The Merry Widow.

=== Concert and recitals ===
Since 2010, Edelmann has intensified his concert activities with guest performances and recitals at the following stages: Konzerthaus, Vienna; Musikverein, Vienna; Berliner Philharmonie; Berwald Hall, Stockholm; Charles Bronfman Auditorium, Tel Aviv; Philharmonie Warsaw; Festspielhaus Salzburg; Brucknerhaus, Linz; Mozarteum concert hall; Prinzregententheater; Laeiszhalle, Hamburg; Kölner Philharmonie; Philharmonie am Gasteig, Munich; Konzerthaus Dortmund; Philharmonie Luxembourg; Palau de la Música de València, Saint Petersburg Philharmonia; Palacio de Bellas Artes in Mexico; Kurhaus, Wiesbaden; Kongresshaus Zürich, Lucerne Culture and Congress Centre; Victoria Hall, Geneva; Rudolfinum, Prag; Rheingau Musik Festival and Moscow Conservatory. He often sang duet concerts with his brother.

=== Television appearances ===
Edelmann made several television appearances. In 1998, he sang the bass part in Haydn's Die Schöpfung at a performance at the Vatican in the presence of Pope John Paul II; in 2006, he performed Mozart's Coronation Mass at the Vatican with the Vienna Philharmonic. In 2007, 2008 and 2011, he sang at the event Christmas in Vienna at the Vienna Konzerthaus alongside Elīna Garanča, José Cura and Juan Diego Flórez.

=== Recordings ===
In 2014 and 2015 his song albums Schumann – Selected Songs and Johannes Brahms's Op. 33, Die schöne Magelone, accompanied by Charles Spencer were released. In autumn 2016, the album Reger – Orchestral Songs accompanied by the Staatsphilharmonie Rheinland-Pfalz was released on the Capriccio label. In 2018, Edelmann's fourth album for Capriccio was The Schubert Album.
