= Tamara Maliukova Sidorenko =

Ukrainian composer, music educator and pianist

Tamara Stepanovna Maliukova Sidorenko (15 February 1919 – 20 November 2005) was a Ukrainian composer, music educator and pianist.

Sidorenko was born in Odesa. She studied piano at the Nikolayev Music School and graduated from the Odesa Conservatory in 1946, where she studied composition with Serafim D. Orfeyev. Sidorenko taught at the Odesa Conservatory and later chaired the composition and theory department at the Odesa Music School until 1970. Her students included Oleksandr Krasotov.

Sideorenko arranged many Czech, Polish, Russian, and Ukrainian folk songs. She wrote music for unspecified films and television programs; composed cantatas based on texts by L. Barabanov, V. Bobrov, Andrei Voznesensky, and E. Yanvarov; choruses based on texts by Nikolay Nekrasov, Taras Shevchenko, and Lesya Ukrainka; and songs based on texts by V. Karpeko, Federico García Lorca, Roberto Fernandez Retamar, Shevchenko, A. Tolstoy, S. Vasiliev, Sergei Yesenin, and others. Her instrumental compositions included:

== Chamber ==
- Kolkhoz String Quartet
- Pieces for Cello and Piano
- Pieces for Viola
- String Quartet No. 1
- String Quartet No. 2 on Ukrainian Themes

== Orchestra ==
- Bogdan Khmeinitzky Overture
- Suite of Ancient Dances
- Symphony No. 1
- Symphony No. 2
- Symphony No. 3

== Piano ==
- Cycle Piece in Old Style
- Preludes
- Sonatas
