= Oleksandr Krasotov =

Ukrainian composer

Oleksandr Krasotov Олександр Красотов

Background information
- Born: May 5, 1936; Odesa, Ukrainian SSR, Soviet Union
- Died: October 5, 2007 (aged 71) Tianjin, China
- Genres: Classical
- Occupation: Composer
- Instrument: Piano

Oleksandr Oleksandrovych Krasotov (Note: Ukrainian: Олександр Олександрович Красотов, romanized: Oleksandr Oleksandrovych Krasotov, anglicized: Alexander Alexandrovich Krasotov) (5 May 1936 – 5 October 2007) was a Ukrainian composer and laureate of many national and international prizes. He was born in Odessa and died in Tianjin, China.

== Education ==
Krasotov studied at Odessa State A. V. Nezhdanova Conservatoire (now Odessa State A. V. Nezhdanova Music Academy). He studied composition (Professor Tamara Maliukova Sidorenko), piano (Professor B. Charkovs'kyi) and musicology (Professor A. Kogan) and graduated in 1959. From 1959 to 1969 he received master-courses from Professor Y.A. Fortunatov and Professor Nikolay Peyko (Ivanovo, Moscow). In 1969 Krasotov received the title Doctor of Arts. Finally he worked as Invited Professor of Composition at the Conservatoire of Music in Tianjin, China, where he was also giving master-courses. He had many pupils in Ukraine and abroad. One of them is a Ukrainian composer Julia Gomelskaya.

== Works ==
Krasotov's works comprise symphonies and operas, musicals and theater music, oratorios, cantatas, chamber music, jazz music and songs. He participated in various national and international competitions where his works have been honoured with many prizes:

- 1967 he was Laureate of the Regional E. E. Bagryts'kyi Prize
- 1967, 1971, 1983: All-Ukrainian Competition in Kiev
- International competitions (Berlin, 1973; Tokio, 1992)
- Honoured in Art of Ukraine (1987).
