= Horst Wilhelm =

German actor

Horst Wilhelm (24 November 1927 – 14 May 2000) was a German operatic and operetta lyrical tenor and actor.

== Life ==
Born in Berlin, Wilhelm sang as a child in Berlin church choirs and as a youth in the youth choir of the Berliner Rundfunk. At the end of the Second World War he was taken prisoner in England as a soldier.

After World War II, Wilhelm received his vocal training from Götte at the Musikhochschule in his hometown Berlin in 1947, before he began at the Deutsche Oper Berlin in 1951, where he was employed as an opera and oratorio singer. In 1956 Wilhelm moved to the opera in Kassel before joining the ensemble of the Hamburg State Opera from 1962 to 1973. Wilhelm also worked in Bayreuth, Vienna, Munich, Glyndebourne and Zurich.

Wilhelm's repertoire of operas and operettas includes Le postillon de Lonjumeau, Der Freischütz, Zar und Zimmermann, Orfeo ed Euridice, Le nozze di Figaro, The Magic Flute, Don Giovanni, Undine, Il barbiere di Siviglia, L'elisir d'amore, Cavalleria rusticana, La Bohème, Mignon and Carmen. He was also internationally active as a concert singer and appeared with his vocal skills several times in front of film and television cameras. His last place of work was Lübeck, where he taught as a teacher at the local conservatory from 1973. According to a report in the Hamburger Abendblatt he died not there, but in Hamburg at the age of 82.

== Filmography ==
(Vocal performances)

- 1953: Zu Gast bei Dorothea Wieck
- 1954: Clivia
- 1954: Ballett und Pantomime
- 1963: Die Zauberflöte
- 1964: Karussell (TV-Unterhaltungsreihe, eine Folge)
- 1965: Vom Ersten das Beste
- 1968: Immer wieder jung
- 1969: The Devils of Loudun
- 1969: Jacques Offenbach – ein Lebensbild
- 1970: Zar und Zimmermann
- 1976: Schlagerfestival 1926
- 1976: Schlagerfestival 1930
