= Manina (opera) =

Operetta by Nico Dostal

Manina is a 1942 German-language operetta by Nico Dostal to a libretto by Hans Adler and Alexander Lix. It premiered on 28 November 1942 at the Admiralspalast in Berlin.

== Recording ==
Hedi Klug, Peter Minich, Else Rambausek, Fritz Muliar, Orchester des Österreichischen Rundfunks, Rudolf Bibl 1961
