= Luci mie traditrici =

Opera by Salvatore Sciarrino

- Opera by Salvatore Sciarrino
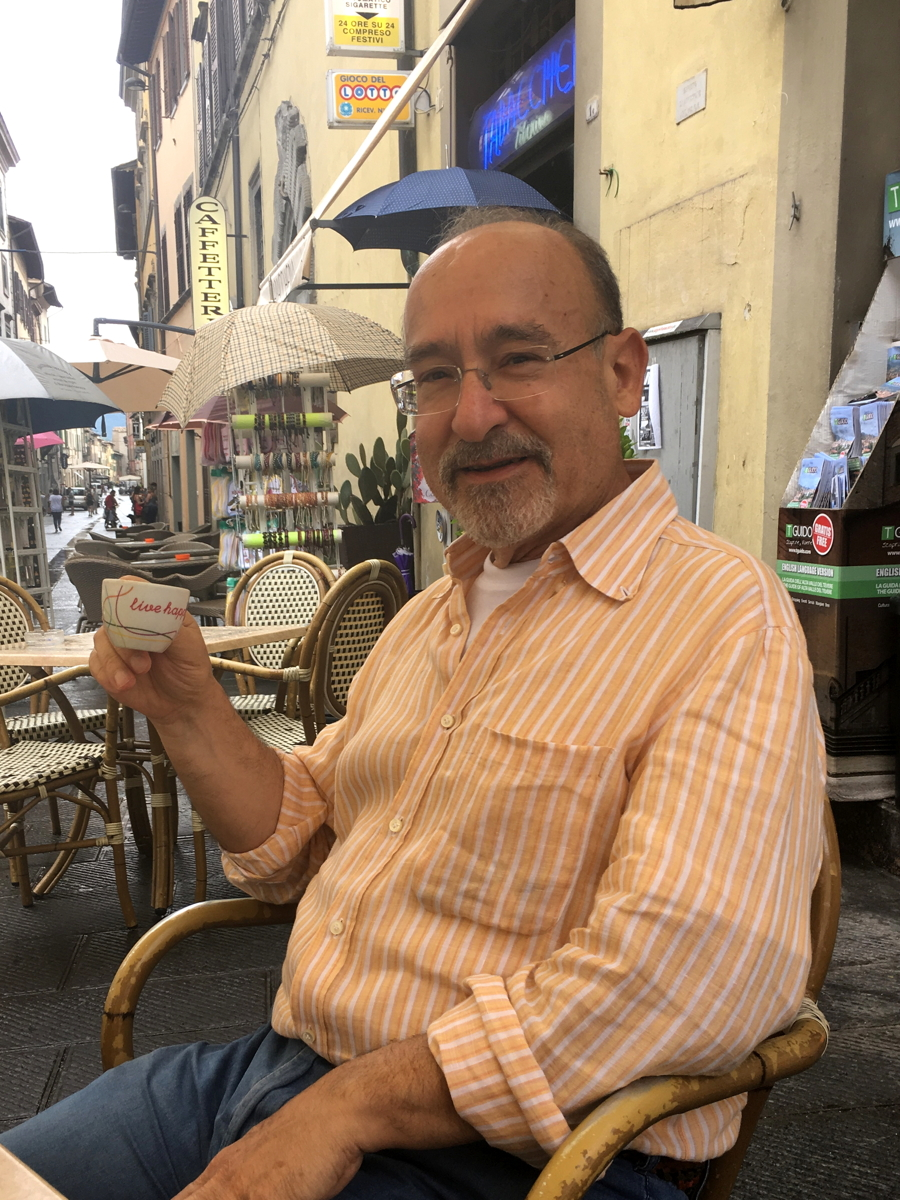
- Sciarrino in 2016
- Translation: My Traitorous Eyes
- Other title: Die tödliche Blume
- Language: Italian
- Based on: Il tradimento per l'onore
- Premiere: 19 May 1998 (in German); Schwetzingen Festival

Luci mie traditrici (My Traitorous Eyes) is an opera in two acts by Salvatore Sciarrino, who also wrote the libretto. It was first performed under the German title Die tödliche Blume (The Deadly Flower) on 19 May 1998 in the Schlosstheater Schwetzingen at the Schwetzingen Festival. The title is taken from a line in the opera by the countess. The couple's name 'Malaspina' is of an Italian noble family, but it translates as 'evil thorn'. A performance lasts about 1 1/4 hours.

== Composition history ==
Sciarrino started composing the opera in 1996. He based the libretto on the 1590 murder by the composer Carlo Gesualdo of his wife and her lover, but while working on it he discovered that Alfred Schnittke was also composing an opera (Gesualdo, 1993) on the same story. Deleting the references to Gesualdo, Sciarrino turned to a play, Il tradimento per l'onore, by Giacinto Andrea Cicognini, (Note: Diego Simini from the University of Salento attributed this play in 2012 to the Venetian lawyer Francesco Stramboli.) and also used an elegy of Claude Le Jeune, based on a text by Pierre de Ronsard. Sciarrino dedicated the opera to Marilisa Pollini, Maurizio Pollini's wife.

== Roles ==
Roles, voice types, premiere cast
Role	Voice type	Premiere cast, 19 May 1998 Conductor: Pascal Rophé
La Malaspina (Countess Malaspina)	soprano	Sharon Spinetti
Il Malaspina (Count Malaspina)	baritone	Paul Armin Edelmann
L'Ospite (The Guest)	countertenor	Kai Wessel
Un servo della casa (The Servant)	tenor	Georg Nigl
Voce dietro il sipario (The voice behind the scene)	countertenor	Kai Wessel

== Synopsis ==
Place: The home of the Count and Countess
Time: Late sixteenth century

Act 1
In the prologue, a backstage voice sings Le Jeune's French elegy. It is morning, and the count and countess declare their eternal love. The servant announces the arrival of the guest. After a short intermezzo, it is now mid-day. The countess and the guest make love. As darkness descends, the guest leaves and the countess is alone with the servant.

Act 2
In the evening, the count forgives the countess. Later that night, the countess opens the curtains of her bed, discovering the dead body of the guest. The count stabs the countess and she collapses on the body of the guest.

== Performance history ==
Following the Schwetzingen premiere, the opera has been performed at the Théâtre Royal de la Monnaie in Brussels and in New York with choreography by Trisha Brown (2001), as well as by the Ensemble Risognanze (2003) and at the Salzburg Festival (2008), the Berlin Festival of Contemporary Music (2010), a co-production between the Festival of Contemporary Art in Montepulciano (2010) and Oper Frankfurt (2011) as well as at the Berlin State Opera (2016).

== Recordings ==
Year	Cast La Malaspina, Il Malaspina, L'Ospite Un servo	Conductor, opera house and orchestra	Label
2000	Anette Stricker, Otto Katzameier, Kai Wessel, Simon Jaunin	Beat Furrer, Klangforum Wien	CD: Kairos; Cat: KAI0012222
2002	Junko Saito, Timothy Sharp, Galina Tchernova, Ralph Heiligtag	Tito Ceccherini, ensemble Risognanze	CD: Stradivarius; Cat: STR33645
2010	Nina Tarandek, Christian Miedl, Roland Schneider, Simon Bode	Marco Angius, Ensemble Algoritmo	DVD Video: EuroArts; Cat: 2059038 (2011) CD: Stradivarius; Cat: STR33900
