= Harald Serafin =

Austrian opera singer and artistic director (1931–2025)

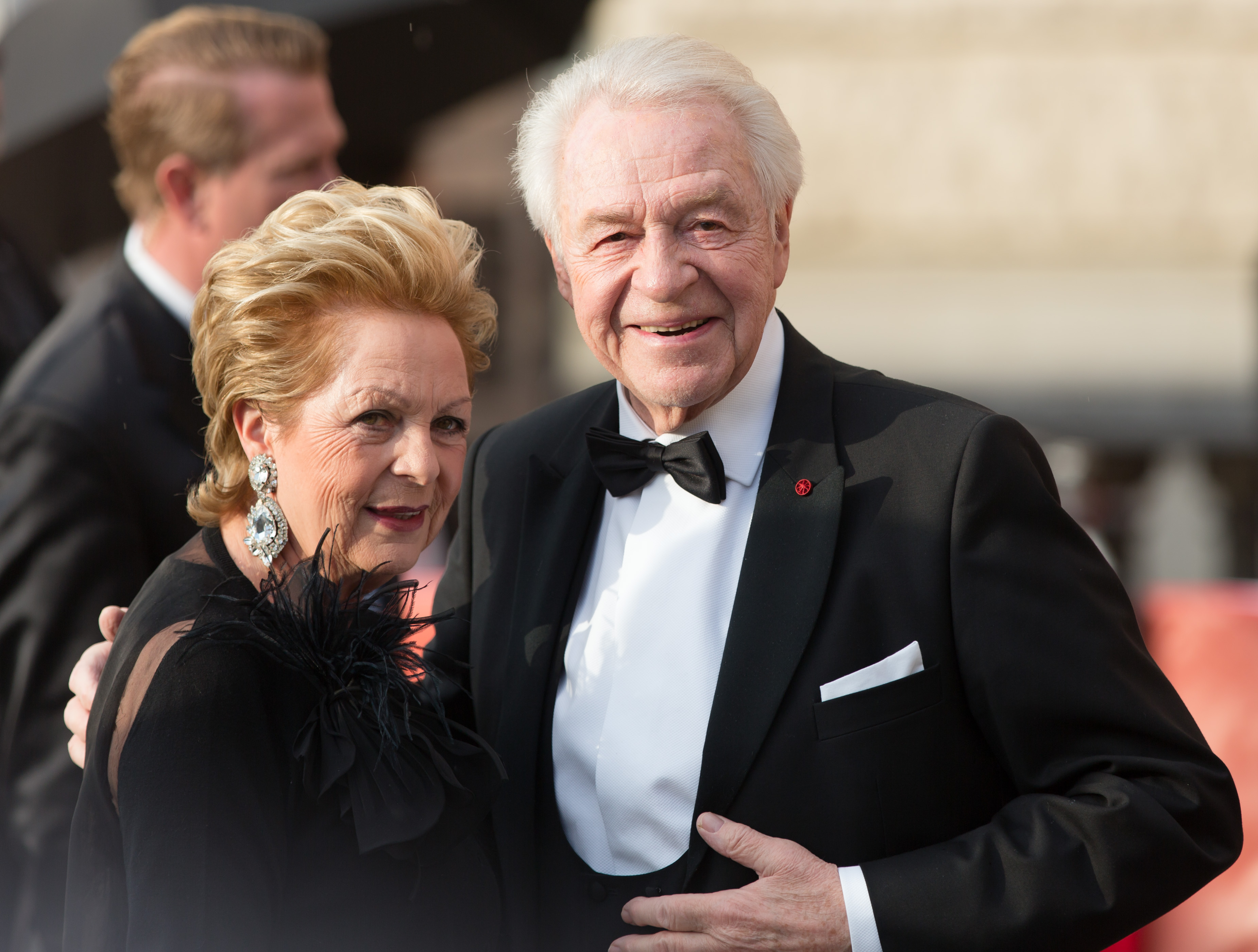
Harald and Ingeborg Serafin, 2016

Harald Serafin (24 December 1931 – 15 September 2025) was an Austrian opera singer (baritone) who was the recipient of multiple awards and decorations, and other tokens of recognition.

From 1992 to 2012 he was artistic director of the Seefestspiele Mörbisch festival.

Serafin died on 15 September 2025, at the age of 93.
