= Otto Edelmann =

Austrian opera singer (1917–2003)

Otto Edelmann (5 February 1917 – 14 May 2003) was an Austrian operatic bass.

== Life ==
Edelmann was born in Vienna and studied singing with Gunnar Graarud. His debut was at Gera as Figaro in Mozart's The Marriage of Figaro. He later sang the Vienna State Opera, the Edinburgh International Festival and the Metropolitan Opera. He sang at the Bayreuth Festival immediately after its reopening in 1951 after World War II, performing the role of Hans Sachs in Wagner's Die Meistersinger von Nürnberg. (He also recorded as Veit Pogner the goldsmith in the same work in one of Hans Knappertsbusch's early recorded performances.) He also sang Ochs in Richard Strauss's Der Rosenkavalier at the first performances in the new Salzburg Festspielhaus in 1960. In 1957, he recorded the role of Wotan opposite Kirsten Flagstad in Georg Solti's recording of Act III of Wagner's Die Walküre (an album made prior to the later famous complete set of Der Ring des Nibelungen). In 1982, he received a professorship for vocal pedagogy at the Vienna Music Academy. He died in Vienna at the age of 86.

== Personal life ==
He is the father of the Austrian baritones Peter Edelmann and Paul Armin Edelmann.

== Voice ==
His powerful, dark voice has proven itself in Wagner roles as well as in tasks from the Buffo subject.

== Recordings ==
=== CDs ===
Edelmann sang Ochs in Paul Czinner's classic recording of Der Rosenkavalier conducted by Herbert von Karajan with Elizabeth Schwarzkopf and Christa Ludwig.

=== Videos ===
Videos are available of him as Baron Ochs (with Elisabeth Schwarzkopf) and Leporello (with Cesare Siepi).

== Awards ==
- 1960 Kammersänger
- 1971 Max Reinhardt Medal
- Honorary member of the Wiener Staatsoper
- 1994 Lieber Augustin
- Golden Decoration of Honour for Services to the Republic of Austria
