= Anja-Nina Bahrmann =

German operatic soprano

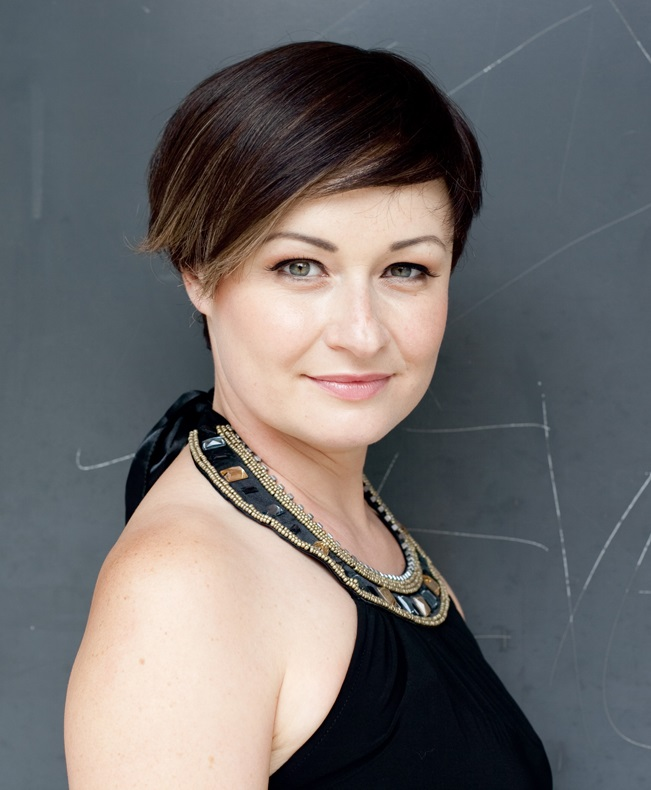
Anja-Nina Bahrmann

Anja-Nina Bahrmann (born 1980) is a German opera, operetta, Lied and concert soprano.

== Life ==
Born in Siegburg, Bahrmann began her studies in 2001 at the Hochschule für Musik Saar in the voice class of Rosemarie Bühler-Frey. She deepened her vocal studies at the Robert Schumann Hochschule Düsseldorf. Her singing teacher there was Jeanne Piland. Anja-Nina Bahrmann also took lessons in the Lied class of Matthias Goerne and attended master classes with Ingeborg Most, Christiane Oelze, Leonard Hokanson and Christine Schäfer. She completed her studies in 2006 with a diploma.

She won several prestigious prizes while still a student. In 2003, she won 3rd prize at the EURIAD-Vocaal Concours in the Netherlands and also received a special prize for her exceptional song interpretation. At the 4th International Hilde Zadek Singing Competition 2005 in Vienna she received the Schönberg Prize. In the same year, Bahrmann won two further prizes: 1st prize at the Richard Strauss Competition and also 1st prize at the Schmolz and Bickenbach Competition. In 2005, she received two scholarships: from the Hans and Eugenia Jütting Foundation in Stendal and from the Basel DOMS Foundation.

== Repertoire ==
Bahrmann gained stage experience at a very early age. In addition to opera school productions, she sang the role of Noemie in Jules Massenet's rarely performed opera Cendrillon as a guest at the Deutsche Oper am Rhein in the 2004/05 season. In summer 2006 she sang Juliette in Franz Lehár's operetta The Count of Luxembourg (DVD) at the Seefestspiele Mörbisch. In 2007, she sang Barbarina in the marriage of Figaro at the Theater an der Wien and in 2009 Flaminia in Haydn's Il mondo della luna, conducted by Nikolaus Harnoncourt.

With the 2006/07 season, Anja-Nina Bahrmann became an ensemble member at the Landestheater Linz. Since the 2009/10 season, Bahrmann has been a permanent ensemble member of the Volksoper Wien.

Her roles from opera and operetta include: the title role in Cavalli's La Calisto, Konstanze and Blondchen in The Abduction from the Seraglio, Susanna in The Marriage of Figaro, Pamina in the magic flute, Adele in Die Fledermaus, Musette in La Bohème, Norina in Don Pasquale, Sophie in Der Rosenkavalier, Laura in Der Bettelstudent, Oskar in Un ballo in maschera, Zerbinetta in Ariadne auf Naxos, Rosina in The Barber of Seville, Gretel in Engelbert Humperdinck's fairy tale opera Hänsel und Gretel and the prima donna Corilla in Donizetti's Viva la Mamma (staged by Rolando Villazón).

At the 2013 and 2014 Bregenz Festival, Bahrmann performed with great success as Pamina. As Liu in Turandot she debuted alongside Neil Shicoff as Kalaf at the Vienna Volksoper in 2014 and has also appeared there as Violetta in La traviata. She first sang Zdenka in Arabella under Bertrand de Billy at the New National Theatre, Tokyo and in Düsseldorf in 2015. In 2016, she embodied Antonia in Tales of Hoffmann at the Vienna Volksoper. She returned to the Bayerische Staatsoper in December 2016 January 2017 as Adele in the Strauss operetta Die Fledermaus. In autumn 2017 she made her debut as Amalia in Verdi's I Masnadieri at the Vienna Volksoper.

In addition to her stage appearances, Bahrmann is active as a Lied and concert singer. Her repertoire includes works by Hugo Wolf, Aaron Copland, Johannes Brahms, Joseph Haydn, Johann Sebastian Bach, Carl Orff, Felix Mendelssohn Bartholdy, Wolfgang Amadeus Mozart and Richard Strauss.
