= Otto Ackermann (conductor) =

Romanian conductor

- Occupation: conductor

Otto Ackermann (18 October 1909 – 9 March 1960) was a Romanian conductor who made his career mainly in Switzerland.

Otto Ackermann directing (1954-1955)

Ackermann was born in Bucharest. He studied at Bucharest Academy of Music and the Berlin Hochschule.

He conducted the Royal Romanian Opera on tour when aged only 15, and then held many important appointments as operatic conductor, beginning with Düsseldorf Opera, 1928-1932 (when aged 18 to 23). Then he was at Brno (1932-1935), Bern (1935-1945) and Vienna, with much travelling and concert-giving all over Europe, and recordings made with the Vienna Philharmonic, the Netherlands Philharmonic and the Zurich Tonhalle Orchestra. He held Swiss citizenship.

Ackermann was a close friend of Franz Lehár and made Columbia Records recordings of his operettas, which are distinguished by their typical Viennese lilting and phrasing, despite being made with an English orchestra (the Philharmonia Orchestra). Ackermann conducted the earlier recording of the Four Last Songs of Richard Strauss with Elisabeth Schwarzkopf.

He died at Wabern bei Bern (Bern) in March 1960, aged 50.

== Sources ==
- E.M.I., A Complete List of His Master's Voice, Columbia, Parlophone and M.G.M. Long Playing Records, up to June 1955 (EMI, London 1955).
