= Rupert Bergmann =

Austrian bass-baritone opera singer

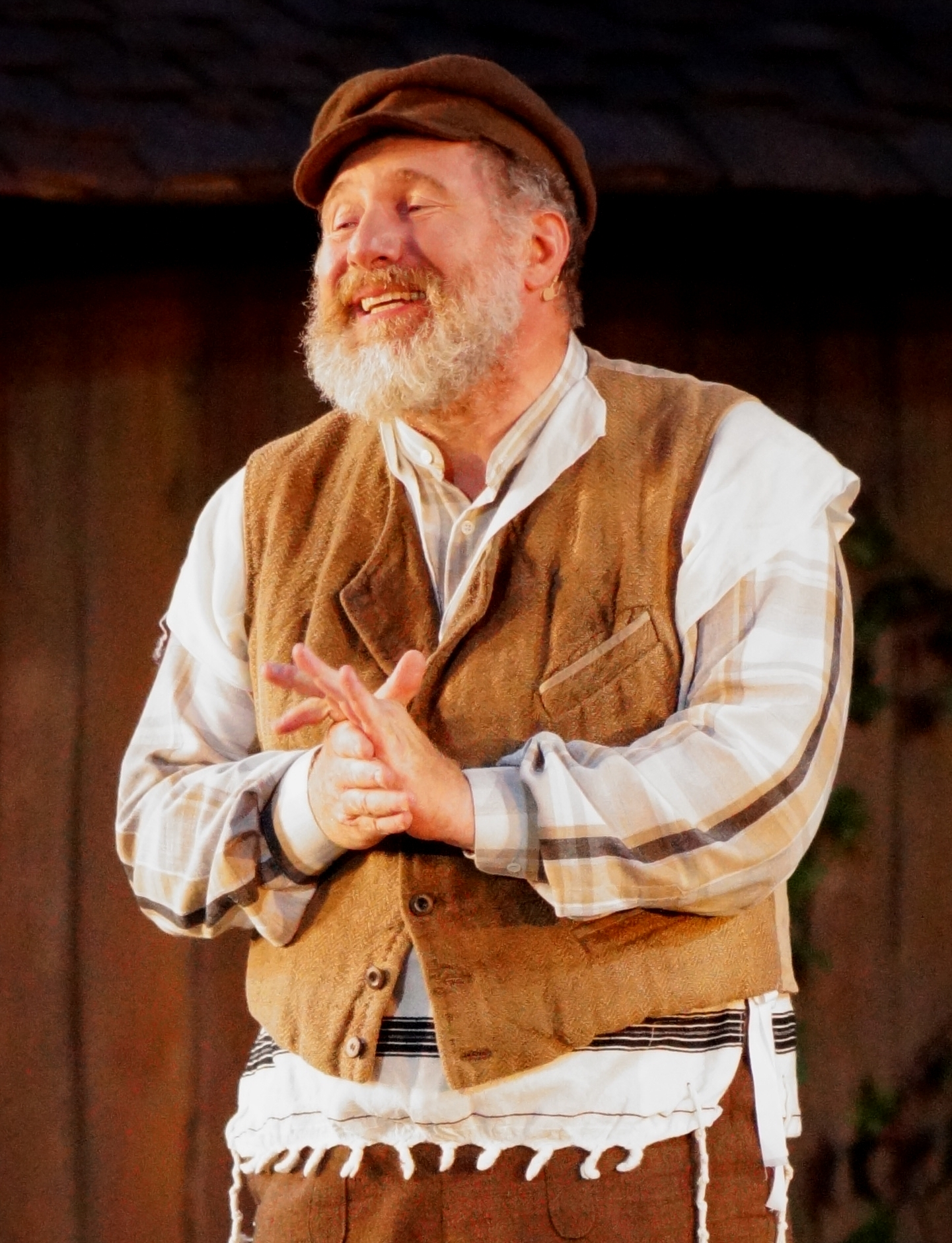
Bergmann as Tevje in Fiddler on the Roof, Seefestspiele Mörbisch, 2014

Rupert Bergmann (born 14 June 1965) is an Austrian opera singer (bass-baritone). He works mainly on contemporary music theatre as well as operetta and musical.

In 2011 he presented Vogel Herzog Idiot, three "Mini-Mono-Operas" written for him by three different composers (in collaboration with Theater an der Wien).

== Discography ==
- As Maliniak in Die Bessesenen by Johannes Kalitzke, CD of the production at Theater an der Wien 2010/2012
