= Jean Doussard =

French conductor (1928–2015)

Jean Doussard (1 July 1928 – 17 December 2015) was a French conductor.

== Biography ==
Jean Doussard was born in Saint-Melaine-sur-Aubance on 1 July 1928. He began his studies at the Music Conservatory of Angers, and later at the Paris Conservatory, where he was a pupil of Jean Fournet, Paul Van Kempen, and Ferdinand Leitner. He won first prize at the international music competition of Besançon in 1952, and Siena in 1953.

Doussard began his career as conductor of the "Orchestre Radio Symphonique" of Algiers (1953–55). He was then named first conductor of the "International Ballet du Marquis de Cuervas" (1956–61), and with that formation went on tour in China.

After making guest appearances at the Opéra de Lyon and the Opéra de Paris, he became permanent conductor at the opera house of Nancy from 1975 to 1979, and at the Opéra de Lille from 1979 onwards.

Doussard died in Vannes on 17 December 2015, at the age of 87.

== Selective discography ==
- Lecocq - La fille de Madame Angot - (EMI, 1972)
- Planquette - Les cloches de Corneville - (EMI, 1973)
- Johann Strauss II - Valses de Vienne - (EMI, 1971)

== Sources ==
- Dictionnaire des interprètes, Alain Pâris, (Éditions Robert Laffont, 1989) ISBN 2-221-06660-X
