= Die ungarische Hochzeit =

Operetta by Nico Dostal

Die ungarische Hochzeit (The Hungarian Wedding) is a 1939 operetta by Nico Dostal to a libretto by Hermann Hermecke. It was premiered 4 February 1939 in Stuttgart.

== Recordings ==
- Die ungarische Hochzeit – Anny Schlemm, Franz Fehringer, Ruth Zillger, Willy Hofmann, Lissy Niemz, Jürgen Goslar, Hans Schanzara, Herta Talmar, Kurt Großkurth, Walter Gruberth, Paul Bürks, Herbert Hennies, Friedrich Himmelmann, Kölner Rundfunkchor & Kölner Rundfunkorchester, Franz Marszalek 1955
- Die ungarische Hochzeit – Jevgenij Taruntsov, Regina Riel, Thomas Zisterer, Tomas Kovacic, Rita Peterl, Chor des Lehar Festivals Bad Ischl, Franz Lehar-Orchester, Marius Burkert. CPO, 2015
- selections – Margit Schramm, Anton de Ridder, Willi Brokmeier, Isy Orén, Chor der Städtischen Bühnen Köln, Philharmonia Hungarica Roman Dostal EMI
