= Marie Dietrich (soprano) =

German opera singer (1868–1939)

Marie Dietrich (26 January 1868 – 14 December 1939) was a German operatic soprano and voice teacher.

== Life ==
Born in Stuttgart or Weinsberg Dietrich began her vocal studies with Mrs. Bader in Stuttgart and Ferdinand Jäger. Originally she wanted to become a concert singer, but when she heard the then court theatre director at a concert of the commercial association in Göppingen, he invited her to an audition. Thereupon she was engaged for three years at the Hoftheater Stuttgart.

She liked it there, but because she felt that her voice needed further training, she took a three-month vacation in the first year and went to Paris to study with Pauline Viardot-Garcia. As she made good progress, she also went to Paris for a second and third year.

In 1891 she made a guest appearance at the Hofoperntheater in Vienna as "Rosine", "Philine" and "Susanne" with such success that she was offered an engagement. But she decided on the Hofoperntheater in Berlin, which had given her a contract at the same time.

She stayed there until 1912 (stage farewell August 1912 as "Marie" in Der Waffenschmied by A. Lortzing). After that she worked as a concert singer and singing teacher.

She was an excellent coloratura singer, whose technical skill was especially praised, as well as the sparkling light fluid of her passages and fioritura. The voice, a modulation-capable soprano of considerable size, was characterized by an incredibly sympathetically touching timbre and a fresh, melodious sound. Her humorous roles were particularly good.

Marie Dietrich died in 1939 in Berlin at age 71. Her unpreserved grave was on one of the Friedhöfe vor dem Halleschen Tor. On which exactly, is not known.

== Recording ==
- J. Strauss's: Die Fledermaus, with Willy Domgraf-Fassbaender, Margret Pfahl, Adele Kern; conductor: Hermann Weigert, Orchester der Staatsoper Berlin, 1929
