= Die Vielgeliebte =

Operetta by Nico Dostal

Die Vielgeliebte is a 1934 operetta by Nico Dostal to a libretto by Franz Maregg and Rudolf Köller.

== Recording ==
- Elfie Mayerhofer, Heinz Hoppe, Hedda Heuser, Harry Friedauer, Kurt Großkurth, Choir of the Bayerischen Rundfunks, Münchner Rundfunkorchester, Werner Schmidt-Boelcke 1958
