= Josef Herrmann =

German opera singer

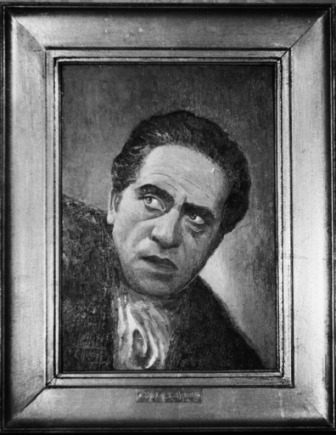
KS Herrmann 2 wik

Josef Herrmann (20 April 1903 - 19 November 1955) was a German baritone, notable for his performances in the operas of Richard Wagner.

He was born in Darmstadt and made his professional debut at Kaiserslautern. He subsequently sang with the opera companies at Stettin (Szczecin), Königsberg and Nuremberg before becoming principal baritone in Dresden, where, in the 1940s, he sang roles such as Scarpia in Tosca and Iago in Otello, as well as the German repertory. In 1942, he sang in the première of Heinrich Sutermeister's literaturoper Die Zauberinsel (based on The Tempest).

In 1950, he appeared as The Wanderer and Gunther at La Scala, Milan, in performances of Der Ring des Nibelungen conducted by Wilhelm Furtwängler.

Herrmann died at Hildesheim at the age of 52.

== Selected recordings ==
- Der Ring des Nibelungen: live performances from La Scala conducted by Furtwängler, 1950 (Opera d'Oro)
- Lebendige Vergangenheit: Josef Herrmann (Preiser Records, 1995)

== Sources ==
- New Grove Dictionary of Opera, vol 2, p. 706.
