= Margit Schramm =

German soprano singer (1935–1996)

- Born: 21 July 1935; Dortmund, Westphalia, Nazi Germany
- Died: 12 May 1996 (aged 60); Munich, Germany
- Education: Wiener Musikakademie
- Occupations: Operatic soprano; Television presenter; Film actress
- Organizations: Staatstheater am Gärtnerplatz

Margit Schramm (21 July 1935 – 12 May 1996) was a German soprano in operetta, opera and song. She also appeared as a film actress and hosted a television show. In the 1960s, she became known as an operetta diva (called "Queen of operetta") on stage, German television, in numerous concerts and in films, where she often appeared together with her favourite stage partner, the tenor Rudolf Schock.

== Career ==
Born in Dortmund, Schramm studied voice at the conservatory of her hometown. In 1954, she made her stage debut in Benatzky's singspiel Meine Schwester und ich. She made her operatic debut at age 20 as Lucieta in Wolf-Ferrari's opera Die vier Grobriane at the Stadttheater Saarbrücken. Her first operetta role was the title role of Dostal's Clivia.

In 1959, she became a member of the Staatstheater am Gärtnerplatz, focused on operetta. She had a sensational success in Lehár's Der Graf von Luxemburg alongside Rudolf Schock. Her signature role was Hanna Glawari, the title role in Lehár's Die lustige Witwe, which she performed on stage more than 500 times. She also performed the title roles of Fall's Madame Pompadour and Kálmán's Gräfin Mariza, among others. The composer Robert Stolz called her "Königin der Operette" (Queen of operetta). She remained at the house until 1964, then moved to the Theater des Westens in Berlin, from 1965 she also performed at the Vienna Volksoper, in 1967 at the Opernhaus Dortmund and in 1968 at the Staatstheater Wiesbaden.

Schramm took part in several successful operetta films, including adaptations of Paul Lincke's Frau Luna (1964) and of Paul Abraham's Viktoria und ihr Husar (1965), alongside partners including Schock, Johannes Heesters, Brigitte Mira and Gunnar Möller.

She hosted a Saturday evening television show together with Willy Schneider, Die fröhliche Weinrunde (The merry wine round), from 1964 to 1968, with regular guests such as Paul Henckels, Arno Paulsen, Jupp Hussels, Frank Barufski and Kurt Großkurth.

Schramm was married first to Fritz Seidler, then to the director Fred Kraus, father of the pop singer Peter Kraus. She performed with Peter Kraus and Viktor de Kowa in the 1969 television film Walzertraum of Ein Walzertraum by Oscar Straus, with Fred Kraus as director.

When operetta started to lose its impact at the beginning of the 1980s, she left the stage. She lived as a businesswoman in Munich, where she died at the age of 60.
