= London Children's Ballet =

Children's charity in London, England

- Formation: 1994
- Founder: Lucille Briance
- Type: Charitable Trust
- Registration no.: 1165961
- Headquarters: London, England
- Location: United Kingdom
- Artistic Director: Ruth Brill
- Executive Director: Victoria Davison
- Key people: Lucille Briance
- Website: https://www.londonchildrensballet.com/

London Children's Ballet (LCB) is a registered charitable trust created in 1994. LCB is both a performance company and a registered charity, producing and staging one new ballet in London's West End each year and running outreach work throughout the year in primary schools and disadvantaged communities.

== History ==
Lucille Briance founded LCB in 1994 after her daughter showed an interest in auditioning for dance schools. Lucille felt she was too young to join a proper dance school and thus looked for an alternative. She could not find a dance company for children that would allow her daughter to perform as well as continue her academic studies. Lucille therefore decided to create one and LCB was born.
