= Prinzessin Nofretete =

Operetta by Nico Dostal

Prinzessin Nofretete is a 1936 operetta in 2 acts by Nico Dostal to a libretto by Rudolf Köller and the composer. It was premiered at the Cologne Opera.

== Recording ==
- Milko Milev, Lilli Wünscher, Angela Mehling, Jeffery Krueger, Musikalische Komödie Leipzig, Stefan Klingele. Rondeau 2017
