= Peter Edelmann =

Austrian operatic baritone

Peter Edelmann (born 1962) is an Austrian operatic baritone. Since 1 January 2018, he has been the artistic director of the Seefestspiele Mörbisch.

== Life ==
Born in Vienna, Edelmann graduated in singing from the International Academy of Music and Performing Arts Vienna under his father, the bass Otto Edelmann. He made his debut as an opera singer at the Theater Koblenz as Heerrufer in Richard Wagner's Lohengrin. His brother is Paul Armin Edelmann, another baritone.

In 1989, he won the First Prize and the Mozart Prize at the International Hans Gabor Belvedere Singing Competition in Vienna. He was then engaged by Götz Friedrich at the Deutsche Oper Berlin, where he sang the baritone roles in Die Zauberflöte (Papageno), Tannhäuser (Wolfram), Così fan tutte (Guglielmo), Le nozze di Figaro (Conte d'Almaviva), Faust (Valentin) and La Bohème (Marcello). Guest performances took him to various opera houses and concert halls. He has also appeared on television and radio, including ORF, ZDF, ARD, 3sat and Belgian television.

Edelmann has worked with the conductors Lawrence Foster, Friedemann Layer, Jacques Delacôte, Christian Thielemann, Rafael Frühbeck de Burgos, Jiří Kout, Bruno Weil, Ralf Weikert, Leopold Hager, Franz Welser-Möst, John Eliot Gardiner, Eliahu Inbal, Dan Ettinger and Asher Fisch as well as the directors Götz Friedrich, Günter Krämer, Hellmuth Matiasek and Willy Decker.

Since 2012, Edelmann has been a professor and, since October 2014, head of the Institute for University of Music and Performing Arts Vienna.
