= Rudolf Bibl =

Austrian conductor and pianist

Rudolf Bibl (4 May 1929 – 27 January 2017) was an Austrian conductor and pianist.

== Life ==
Born in Vienna, parallel to attending a Gymnasium, Bibl studied piano, clarinet, composition at the Wiener Musikakademie and attended the conducting class of Hans Swarowsky. From 1948, he was répétiteur at the Graz Opera. From 1960, he worked at the Vienna Raimundtheater and the Theater an der Wien. From 1969 to 1973, he was music director in Trier, from where he gave guest performances in France and Luxembourg.

From 1973, he was conductor at the Volksoper Wien, where he conducted over 2,200 performances, including Der Vogelhändler, Die lustige Witwe, Die Csárdásfürstin and Die Fledermaus. From 1995 to 2008, he was musical director of the Seefestspiele Mörbisch, for which he put together his own orchestra, the Symphonieorchester Burgenland, consisting of students from the Joseph-Haydn-Conservatory of the Province of Burgenland.

Guest performances and concert tours abroad took him to Japan, Italy, Germany and France, for example, to the Berlin State Opera and the Opéra Bastille in Paris. At the Vienna State Opera, he conducted Die Fledermaus and Die lustige Witwe from 1999 to 2003.

Bibl remained closely associated with the Vienna Volksoper until the end. In May 2016, he conducted three performances of Kálmán's Die Csárdásfürstin as part of a guest performance in Tokyo, his last conducting was a performance of Die Fledermaus on 1 January 2017. According to the house, he conducted 2273 performances at the Vienna Volksoper.

Bibl died at the age of 87, in Frontignan, France.

Bibl was the grandson of the composer and organist of the same name (1832–1902) and nephew of the historian Viktor Bibl.

== Awards ==
- 1988: Österreichisches Ehrenkreuz für Wissenschaft und Kunst I. Klasse.
- 1991: Honorary member of the Wiener Volksoper.
- 1999: Decoration of Honour for Services to the Republic of Austria.
- 2004: Great Ehrenzeichen des Landes Burgenland.
- 2013: Honorary member of the Seefestspiele Mörbisch.
- Presentation of the Berufstitel Professor.
