= Nico Dostal =

Austrian composer

Nico Dostal (full name: Nikolaus Josef Michael Dostal) (27 November 1895 – 27 October 1981) was an Austrian composer who later specialised in operetta and film music.

== Life ==
Dostal was born in Korneuburg, Lower Austria, and was the nephew of composer Hermann Dostal. He initially studied law at the University of Vienna, but turned to studying music at the Academy for Church Music in Klosterneuburg, and made a name for himself when his Great Mass in D major premiered in Linz in 1913.

After participating in World War I, Dostal worked as the theatre Kapellmeister in Innsbruck, St. Pölten, Vienna, Chernivtsi and Salzburg, before moving to Berlin in 1924, where he turned his hand to secular music. He worked in music publishing and as a freelance arranger for Oscar Straus, Franz Lehár and Robert Stolz, among others.

Whilst working as a Kapellmeister and composer, Dostal wrote the music for the film The Emperor's Waltz (1933) and enjoyed great success with his first operetta Clivia. This was followed by Die Vielgeliebte (1934) (The Much-Loved), Die ungarische Hochzeit (1939) (The Hungarian Wedding), and numerous pieces of film music.

In 1946 Dostal moved to Vienna, then in 1954 to Salzburg, where he continued to devote himself to composition, writing there among other pieces the chamber musical So macht man Karriere (1961) (How To Make a Career). Dostal also composed church music along with operettas and film music.

In 1942 he married the opera singer Lillie Claus, by whom he had one son, Roman Dostal, later a conductor. Dostal died in Salzburg, where he is buried in a grave of honour in the main cemetery, the Salzburger Kommunalfriedhof.

== Works ==
=== Operettas ===
- Die exzentrische Frau, 1922 (The Eccentric Woman)
- Lagunenzauber, 1923 (Lagoon Magic)
- Clivia, 1933
- Die Vielgeliebte, 1934 (The Much-Loved)
- Prinzessin Nofretete, 1936 (Princess Nefertiti)
- Extrablätter, 1937 (Extra Sheets)
- Monika, 1937
- Die ungarische Hochzeit, 1939 (The Hungarian Wedding)
- Die Flucht ins Glück, 1940 (The Flight into Happiness)
- Die große Tänzerin, 1942 (The Great Dancer)
- Eva im Abendkleid, 1942 (Eva in Evening Dress)
- Manina, 1942
- Verzauberte Herzen, 1946 (Enchanted Hearts)
- Ein Fremder in Venedig, 1946 (A Stranger in Venice)
- Süße kleine Freundin, 1949 (Sweet Little Girlfriend)
- Zirkusblut, 1950 (Circus Blood)
- Der Kurier der Königin, 1950 (The Queen's Courier)
- de:Doktor Eisenbart, 1952 (Dr. Eisenbarth)
- de:Der dritte Wunsch, 1954 (The Third Wish)
- Liebesbriefe Operette, 1955 (Love Letters Operetta)
- So macht man Karriere, 1961 (How To Make A Career)
- Rhapsodie der Liebe, 1963 (Rhapsody of Love)
- Der goldene Spiegel (The Golden Mirror)
- Don Juan und Figaro oder Das Lamm des Armen, 1990 (Don Juan and Figaro, or the Lamb of the Poor)

=== Film music ===
- Everybody Wins (1930)
- Three Days Confined to Barracks (1930)
- Headfirst into Happiness (1931)
- The Emperor's Waltz (1933)
- The Cabbie's Song (1936)
- The Holm Murder Case (1938)
- Thirteen Chairs (1938)
- The Optimist (1938)
- The Girl with a Good Reputation (1938)
- Heimatland, 1939, with Wolf Albach-Retty (Homeland)
- The Desert Song, 1939, with Zarah Leander, Gustav Knuth
- The Vulture Wally (1940)
- Black on White (1943)
- Glück bei Frauen, 1944, with Johannes Heesters (Luck/Happiness with Women)
- Child of the Danube (1950)
- Spring on Ice (1951)
- Das Herz einer Frau, 1951 (The Heart of a Woman)
- Starfish (1952)
- A Night in Venice (1953)
- Die Ungarische Hochzeit, 1969, with Maria Schell (The Hungarian Wedding)

== See also ==
- List of Austrians in music

== See also ==
- List of composers
