= Dagmar Schellenberger =

German operatic soprano

Dagmar Schellenberger (born 8 June 1958 in Oschatz) is a German operatic soprano with a large repertoire ranging from Bach to Wagner. She sings Blanche on the critically acclaimed DVD of the La Scala production of Francis Poulenc's opera Dialogues des Carmélites.

She was praised by MusicWeb for her "capacity for expression and nuance" and performed the title role in Lehár's Die Lustige Witwe (The Merry Widow) conducted by Franz Welser-Möst.
