= Monika (opera) =

Operetta by Nico Dostal

Monika is a 1937 operetta by Nico Dostal to a libretto by Hermann Hermecke. The premiere was 3 October 1937 in Stuttgart.

== Recording ==
- Selections on Nico Dostal dirigiert sein beliebtesten Operetten - Die ungarische Hochzeit, Manina, Clivia, Monika, Eurodisc LP
