= Clivia (opera) =

Operetta by Nico Dostal

Clivia is a 1933 operetta by Nico Dostal to a libretto by Charles Amberg. The premiere was 23 December 1933 at the Berlin Theater am Nollendorfplatz. The plot concerns the adventures of a film star, Clivia Gray, in the South American republic of Boliguay and her romance with the Boliguayan president. The premiere featured Lillie Claus, later Dostal's wife, and Walter Jankuhn in the tenor role of the president.

== Recordings ==
- Anneliese Rothenberger, Rupert Glawitsch, Hans Herbert Fiedler, Maria Madlen Madsen, Gerd Martiensen, NWDR SO Hamburg, Wilhelm Stephan 1951
- Sieglinde Feldhofer, Matthias Koziorowski, Anna Brull, Ivan Orescanin, Markus Butter, Chor der Oper Graz, Grazer Philharmoniker, Marius Burkert 2CD CPO 2023
