= Rudolf Christ =

Austrian operatic singer

Rudolf Christ (20 March 1916 in Vienna – 20 April 1982 in Vienna) was an Austrian tenor concert and opera singer.

Christ began his career in 1939 as chorister in the Vienna Volksoper. He then studied for three years with Adolf Vogel in Vienna. In 1941 he made his debut as soloist at the Landestheater in Innsbruck, and he worked from 1946 to 1949 at the Zürich City Theatre as lyric tenor and operetta singer. In 1949 he went back to the Vienna Volksoper, where he remained a member of the company until his retirement in 1976. In addition, Christ was from 1956 engaged at the German Oper am Rhein, at Düsseldorf-Duisburg, and made very numerous guest appearances at the Vienna State Opera, and also at the large theatres in Germany, Austria, Belgium, Italy and Switzerland. From 1955 he very often appeared also at the Salzburg Festival, most notably as Jaquino in Fidelio in 1958.

He was buried in the Grinzinger Cemetery in Vienna.

== Sources ==
- German National Biographical Index.
