= Elmar Albrecht =

German painter and scenic designer

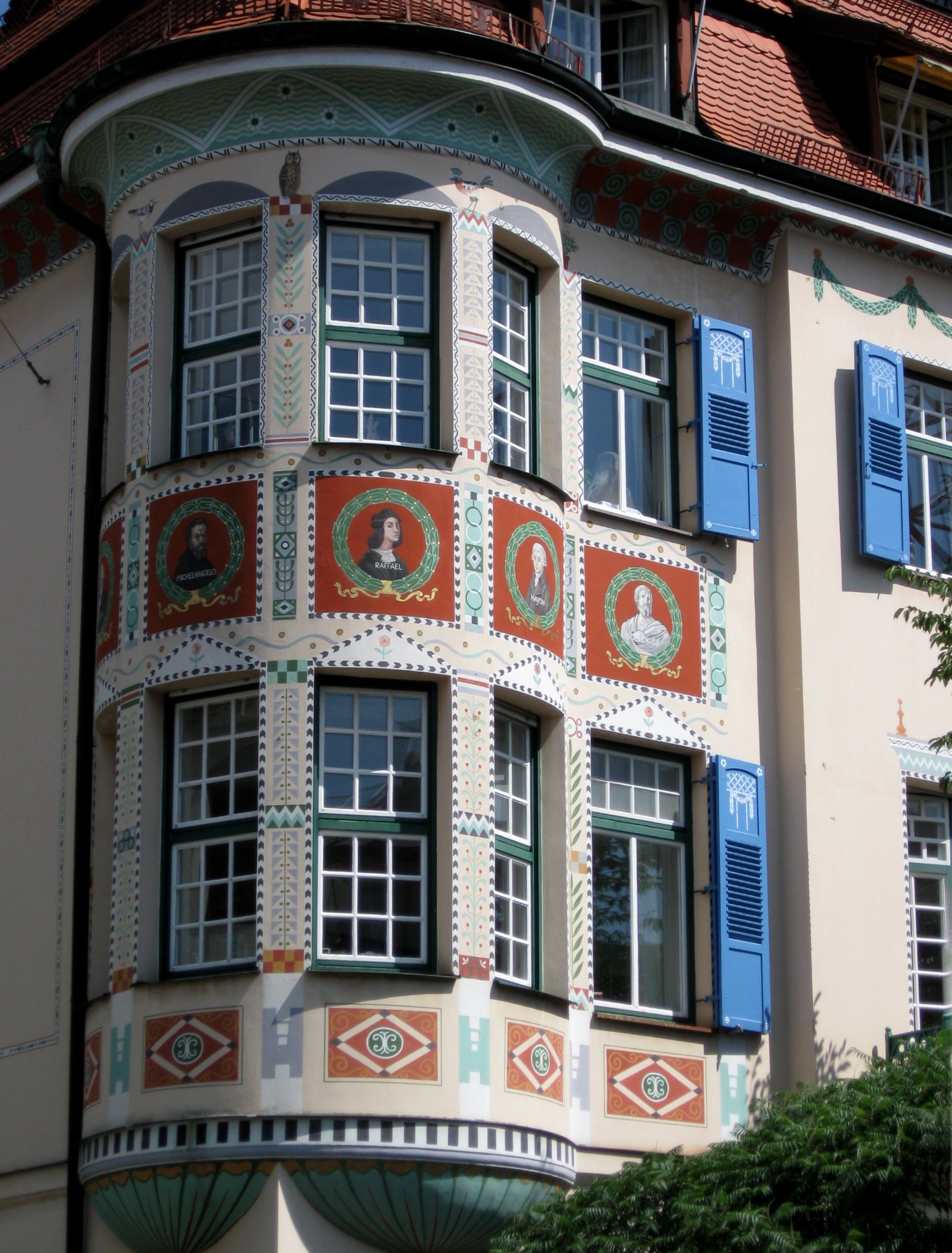
Georgenstraße 10, Munich: The old motifs and colours of the façade were included in the painting plans by Elmar Albrecht, 1976

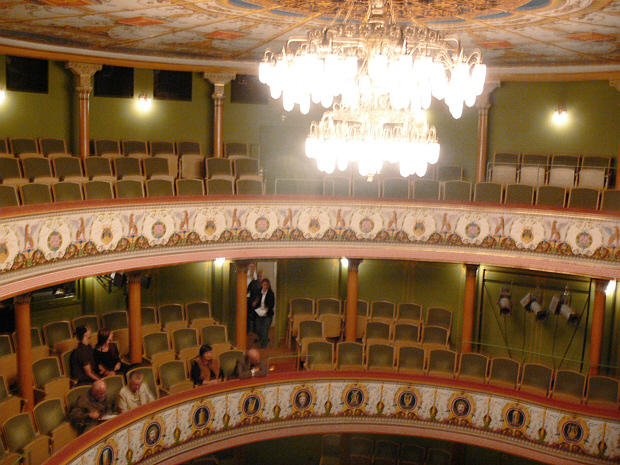
Wilhelma-Theater, Zuschauerraum

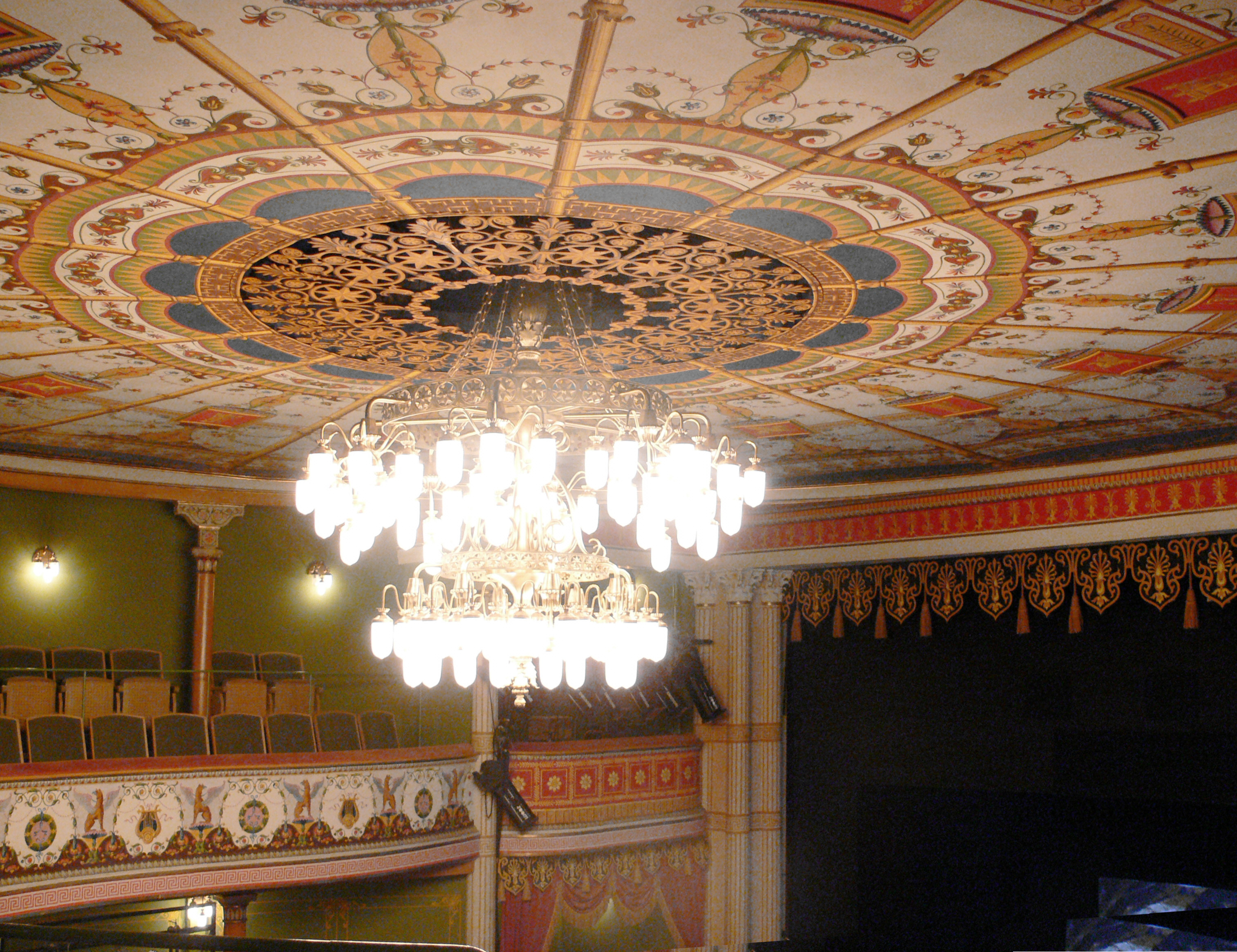
Wilhelma-Theater, Decke im Zuschauerraum

Elmar Albrecht (14 May 1915 – 3 November 1997) was a German painter and scenic designer.

== Life ==
Born in Munich, after an internship at the Bayerische Staatsoper, Albrecht began studying at the Königliche Kunstgewerbeschule München in the applied arts class for scenic and costume art taught by Emil Preetorius. From 1938 to 1939, he was assistant to the head of set design at the Bavarian State Opera. He then worked as the first stage designer at the Theater Freiburg, and from 1948 as a freelance artist in Munich. After the end of the war and captivity, he worked as a freelance artist and stage designer in Munich from 1948.

Albrecht had three children: Arwed Albrecht (1940 – 2017); Angèle Albrecht (1942 – 2000) and Gabriele Holm-Petersen (b. 1944).

== Work ==
From the family tradition as a court gilder, Albrecht had skills that he used in the development of his picture panels from the material of the gilding compound. The relief structures were optionally covered with gold and silver leaves and then alienated. The works since 1948 can primarily be attributed to the style of "Informel", in whose way of thinking Albrecht was anchored.

Many of his themes refer to the mythological world of antiquity. In many pictures there are quotations and allusions to forms of Egyptian or also Greek and Roman antiquity.

Parallel to this, Albrecht repeatedly worked as a freelance stage designer for various productions. For example, he designed the set and costumes for Heinrich von Kleist's The Broken Jug, he designed the set for Carl Orff's Greek tragedy Prometheus at the Munich Marionette Theatre. For the Deutsches Theater München he designed the stage set for Schiller's Intrigue and Love (1962)

He specialised in the restoration of old paintings in theatres. For example, he restored the ceiling of the auditorium in the Nationaltheater München, the ceiling of the auditorium in the Munich Staatstheater am Gärtnerplatz (1969), the Garden Hall and the "Gelbe Foyer" of the Munich Prinzregententheater (1988) and the ceiling and rank draperies of the Theater Koblenz. At the Wilhelma-Theater Stuttgart, the only theatre in Germany with Pompeian decoration, he restored the balustrades and proscenium slogen in 1987. He realised the redesign from found coloured, albeit incomplete, design drawings by Ludwig von Zanth and from comparisons with related pictorial programmes.

In the reading room of the Munich Maximilianeum, Albrecht, together with Klaus Staps, reconstructed murals lost through damage in 1986: the paintings of William III of Orange, Gustav I of Sweden, Cardinal Richelieu and Maximilien de Béthune, Duke of Sully. As the original frescoes no longer existed, they were replaced by new creations that fit in with the ductus of the existing paintings.

Albrecht died in Berlin at the age of 82.

== Exhibitions ==
Albrecht's work has been shown in numerous solo and group exhibitions in Germany, Belgium and Switzerland.

- 1961: Munich, Galerie Deutscher Bücherbund, 20 April – 18 May 1961
- 1965: Antwerp, Kunstkamer
- 1966: Ascona, Galerie Schindler
- 1966: Brüssel, Galerie le Zodiaque.
- 1967: Bern, Galerie Schindler.
- 1968: Marburg, Galerie Heide Elmar Albrecht – Bildtafeln, 14 December 1968 – 15 January 1969
- 1970: Brüssel, Deutsche Bibliothek
- 1970: Minden, Galerie der Commerzbank
- 1972: Deurle, Musée de la fondation J. Dhondt-Dhaenens à Deurle, 17 September – 15 October 1972
- 1972: Puurs, Galerie der Continental Foods Werke
- 1973: Brüssel, Cultureel Centrum van Brüssel, 5 – 21 January 1973, introduction Geo SEMPELSS
- 1973: Kuurne, Galerij Estetika, 17 March – 1 April 1973
- 1995: Germering, Stadthalle.
- 1995: Munich, Ostfoyer Prinzregententheater, Retrospektive 10 – 24 March 1995
- 2006: Munich, Galerie im Augustinum Illusion. Dekoration. Abstraktion.

== Honours ==
- 1991: Order of Merit of the Federal Republic of Germany.

== TV reports ==
- Bericht zur Neugestaltung und Restaurierung des Maximilianeums, ARD, Bayerisches Fernsehen, Abendschau 1985
- Dötsch, Regina: Abendschau-Journal: Theatermaler E. Albrecht, Bayerisches Fernsehen, 6 September 1988 (Report on the 73rd birthday of Elmar Albrecht, in particular on the redesign of the Garden Hall and Foyer at the Prinzregententheater in Munich.)
