= Theater Koblenz =

German theatre

Coordinates: 50°21′29.4″N 7°35′58″E

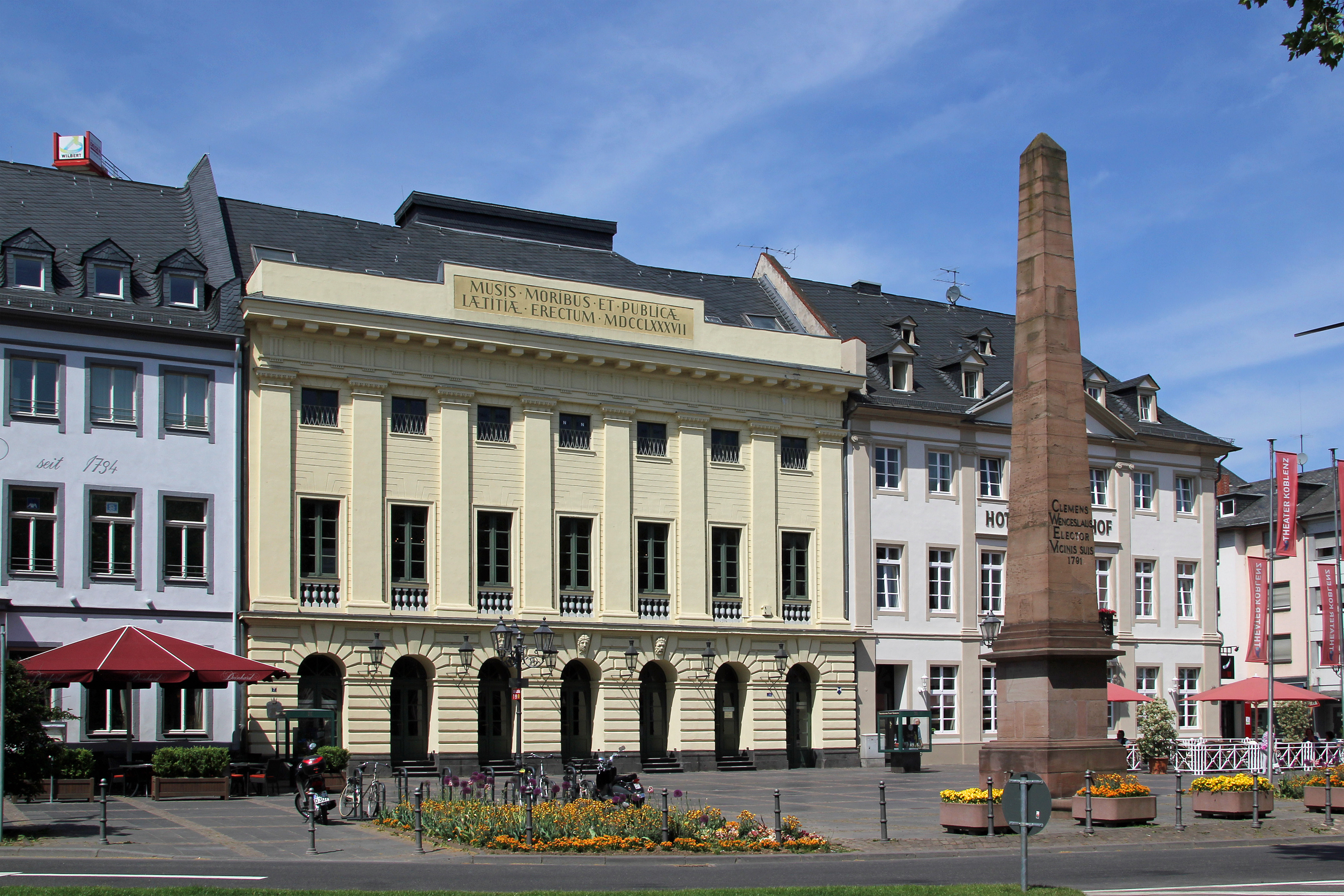
Theatre of Koblenz with the Obelisk on Deinhard Square

The Theater Koblenz is a multi-arts theatre with its own ensembles for drama, music theatre, puppetry and ballet located in Koblenz, Germany. It has about 190 permanent employees from 22 nations and offers 500 seats in a theatre building from the 18th century not far from the Electoral Palace. The manager until the end of the 2024/2025 season is Markus Dietze. Venues include the Theater am Deinhardplatz, rehearsal stages 2 and 4 as well as the Festung Ehrenbreitstein for the summer performances. In addition, the theatre participated in the Koblenz Fortress Plays for several years. In the 2009/2010 season, it was renamed from Theater der Stadt Koblenz to its current name.

Since 1970, the Clemensbrunnen has stood on Deinhardplatz in front of the theatre.

== History ==
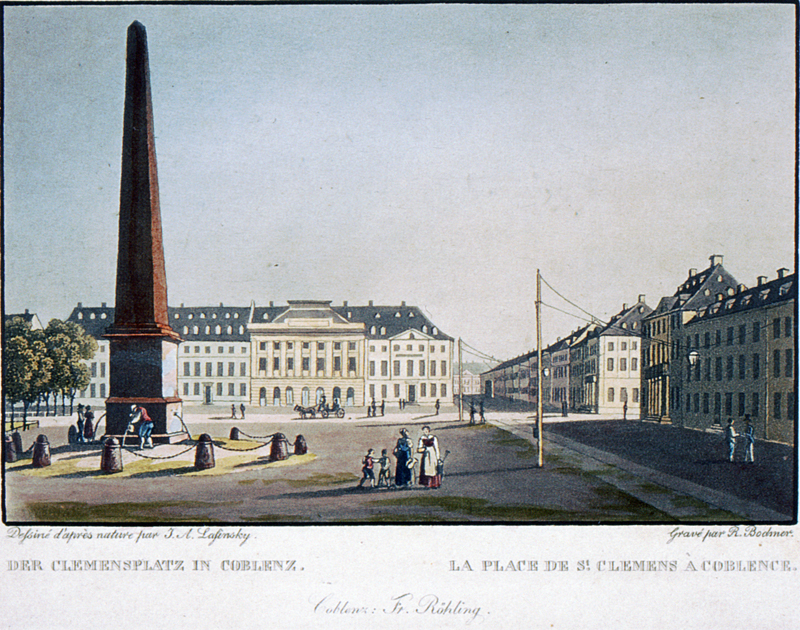
In the background the theatre around 1830, in front of it the Clemensbrunnen at its original location on Clemensplatz

The Koblenz Theatre was commissioned by the Elector and Archbishop of Trier, Clemens Wenzeslaus von Sachsen, and built in 1787 by the architect Peter Joseph Krahe in the then new Neustadt district. The construction was supervised by Johann Andreas Gärtner. The building was modelled on the Italian Logentheater, which was widespread in the 17th century, but above all on the more modern French rank theatres. On 23 November 1787, the theatre, designed as a multi-purpose building, was opened with a performance of Mozart's Die Entführung aus dem Serail under the direction of Johann Heinrich Böhm as Kurfürstliches Komödien- und Ballhaus.

After the end of the electoral and French periods, it passed into private ownership, with the owners changing several times and doing little to maintain the building or provide an ambitious programme. On 16 December 1851, the Koblenz opera singer Henriette Sontag performed in the theatre. It was the first and only performance in her home town. In 1867, at the instigation of Lord Mayor Karl Heinrich Lottner, the theatre was bought at auction by the city of Koblenz. The city had the run-down building renovated by master builder Hermann Nebel in 1869, and the interior was rebuilt in the style of historicism. In 1937 and 1952, further alterations were made to modernise the appearance of the building and bring it into line with current safety regulations.

During the Second World War, the theatre was closed in August 1944, but since it was one of the few buildings in the city centre to remain largely intact during the air raids on Koblenz, it was able to reopen on 1 June 1946. Allegedly, two caretakers had diverted the fire brigade from the government building to the theatre after an air raid in November 1944 with an invented order of the Gauleiter, thus preventing its destruction by fire.

Since the building offered one of the few rooms that had not been destroyed in the war and was large enough, the constituent meeting of the Beratende Landesversammlung, which discussed the constitution of the newly founded state of Rhineland-Palatinate, took place in it on 22 November 1946.

Since the theatre had suffered considerable damage due to its age, no longer complied with the relevant safety regulations and the stage technology was completely outdated, it was comprehensively restored between 1984 and 1985 with the aim of coming as close as possible to its original state of 1787. In the process, the old dimensions of the foyer were restored and the original painting in the auditorium was reconstructed; the façade was also given back its original colour scheme.

Since 2009, the Koblenz Theatre has organised the impuls!v youth theatre festival in cooperation with the Kulturbüro Rheinland-Pfalz and the Kultursommer Rheinland-Pfalz In 2000, the theatre, together with the "Institute for German Studies of the University of Koblenz-Landau and the university's circle of friends, donated the Koblenzer Literaturpreis.

== Building ==
The Koblenz Theatre is the only surviving classical theatre building on the Middle Rhine and the earliest surviving example of a rank theatre in Germany (as opposed to the earlier Logentheater). The exterior of the theatre is characterised by a neo-classical façade with pilasters. The rusticated ground floor has round-arched entrances. The main and mezzanine floors above are connected by colossal pilasters. These are terminated by an architrave with triglyph frieze and a projecting cornice. Attached to this is an attic with a raised central section bearing the Latin inscription 'Musis Moribus Et Publicae Laetitiae Erectum MDCCLXXXVII (To the Muses, to Morality and for the Pleasure of the Public erected 1787). The gable roof is flat and strongly recessed. The present monochrome version in yellow probably corresponds to the original state.

Inside is a flat-roofed vestibule. The main entrances to the playing hall are behind a doric pillar position. The central auditorium, decorated in blue, grey and white, is surrounded by a three-storey, free-floating tier arrangement that encloses the hall in a horseshoe shape. This is aligned with the former electoral box and decorated with illusionary painting dating back to Elmar Albrecht 1984/1985. This painting was created during the restoration according to the architect's preserved original plans; small surviving remnants indicated that it had probably also been executed in this form. The remains found of the original painting (but also of later room paintings) were preserved under the new painting where possible, in order to preserve them for later generations. The stage is flanked by boxes and a fluted pair of double columns. Above the stage is an architrave-like finial with the Latin inscription "Ridendo Corrigo Mores" (Through laughter I improve morals). The flat hall ceiling pretends to be a dome through illusionistic painting and perspective-distorted coffers. There were no preserved findings for this painting, as the ceiling had once been re-plastered, nor do the architect's plans show the ceiling; during the restoration in the 1980s, it was therefore recreated in the style of other classicist buildings. A chandelier is mounted in the centre, which further enhances the perspective effect.

== Monument protection ==
The Koblenz Theatre is a protected cultural monument according to the Denkmalschutzgesetz (DSchG) and registered in the list of monuments of the state of Rhineland-Palatinate. It stands in Koblenz-Altstadt at Deinhardplatz 2.

Since 2002, the Koblenz Theatre has been part of the UNESCO World Heritage Site Upper Middle Rhine Valley. Furthermore, it is a protected cultural property according to the Hague Convention for the Protection of Cultural Property in the Event of Armed Conflict and marked with the blue and white protection sign.
