= Wilbär =

Polar bear born in Stuttgart, Germany

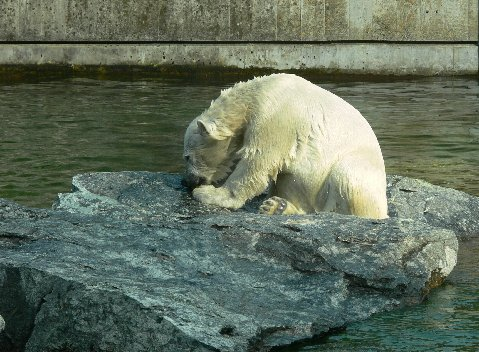
Wilbär in the Wilhelma Zoo.

Wilbär (10 December 2007 – November 2024) was a polar bear who was born in captivity at the Wilhelma Zoo in Stuttgart, Germany. Wilbär made his first public appearance on April 16, 2008, swimming alongside his mother. His name came from combining the name of the zoo with the German word for bear (Bär). Zoo officials have registered the name as a trademark.

== Sweden ==
In May 2009, Wilbär left Wilhelma Zoo and was shipped to Orsa Grönklitt wildlife park in Sweden. There he is paired with Ewa, from the Rotterdam Zoo, and received many gifts from Germany on his birthday. In spring of 2011, zoo officials thought Ewa might be pregnant. Wilbär's first female cub, Miki, was born in December of 2013. Two twin cubs, Noori and Nanook, were born in November of 2021.

== Netherlands ==
On March 12, 2022, Wilbär was transferred to the Dierenrijk Zoo in Nuenen, Netherlands. He died there in mid-November 2024.

== See also ==
- List of individual bears
