= Ludwig von Zanth =

German archirtect and maler

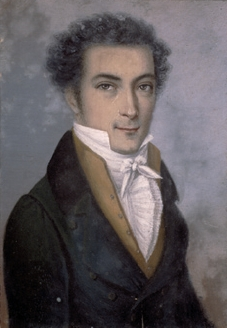
Ludwig von Zanth

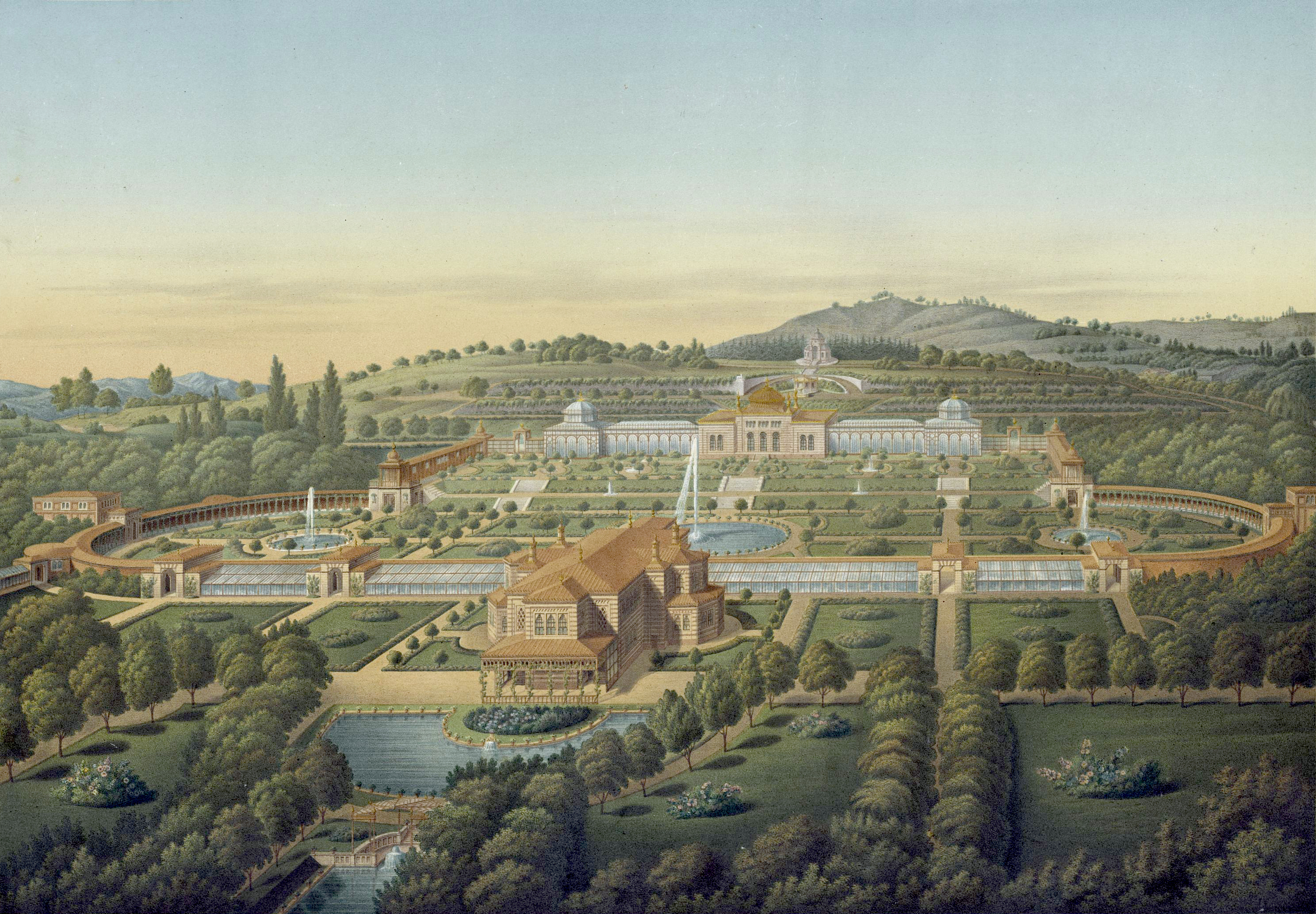
Ludwig von Zanth: View of the Wilhelma (1855). The Wilhelma-Theater (not in the picture) and Wilhelma with its gardens and Moorish buildings are the main works of Ludwig von Zanth.

Karl Ludwig Wilhelm Zanth, from 1844 von Zanth, also Zandt (6 August 1796 – 7 October 1857) was a German architect, architecture critic and watercolor painter.

== Life and career ==
Born in Breslau, Zanth was the son of the Jewish doctor Abraham Zadig, who was in the service of the Prince of Hohenlohe-Ingelfingen. The father converted to Christianity in 1820 and the family took the name "Zanth". Ludwig Zanth attended the art and building school in Breslau. In 1808, the family moved to Kassel. Thanks to a scholarship from the Kingdom of Westphalia, Zanth was able to attend the École polymatique and the Lycée Bonaparte in Paris in the summer and autumn of 1813. At the end of 1813, his father sent his son to Stuttgart, where he completed his school education, especially in the classical languages Latin and Greek, at the Gymnasium. Subsequently, Zanth completed an apprenticeship in the architectural office of the court master builder Ferdinand von Fischer. After stays in Schwäbisch Hall, Ellwangen and Paris, where he contributed to two theatre buildings and converted from the Protestant faith to Catholicism, he settled as an architect in Stuttgart in 1831. There he was responsible for the interior design of the Wilhelm Palais, which was built from 1834 to 1840. King Wilhelm I had this magnificent building, constructed in the classical style, built for his daughters Marie and Sophie.

In 1835, Zanth entered the competition for the construction of a new Royal Court Theatre in Stuttgart. However, the project was not realised. In 1835/36 he planned a house for Adolf von Goppelt in Heilbronn, in 1836/37 the Berkheimer Schlössle for Friedrich Notter and in 1838 a country house for Wilhelm von Taubenheim. In the same year, he drew up the plans for the Wilhelma Theatre in Bad Cannstatt, a building in the style of the French Renaissance with painting in the "Pompeian" style, which was completed in 1840. Subsequently, King Wilhelm I of Württemberg entrusted him with the planning and execution of a public bath in the midst of exotic greenhouses and parks in the immediate vicinity of the Wilhelma Theatre. From 1843 onwards, Zanth planned the Moorish style complex, which was named Wilhelma on the king's instructions, today the name of the zoological-botanical garden located there. It was inaugurated as the Maurisches Landhaus in 1846. The magnificent building was such a success that the architect produced a large-format portfolio of coloured drawings about it. King Wilhelm I of Württemberg appointed him Court Architect and awarded him the Knight's Cross of the Order of the Crown in 1844. This was connected with his elevation to the personal nobility.

The architect was also a talented draughtsman. A still preserved watercolour in the Schloss ob Ellwangen bears witness to his talent.

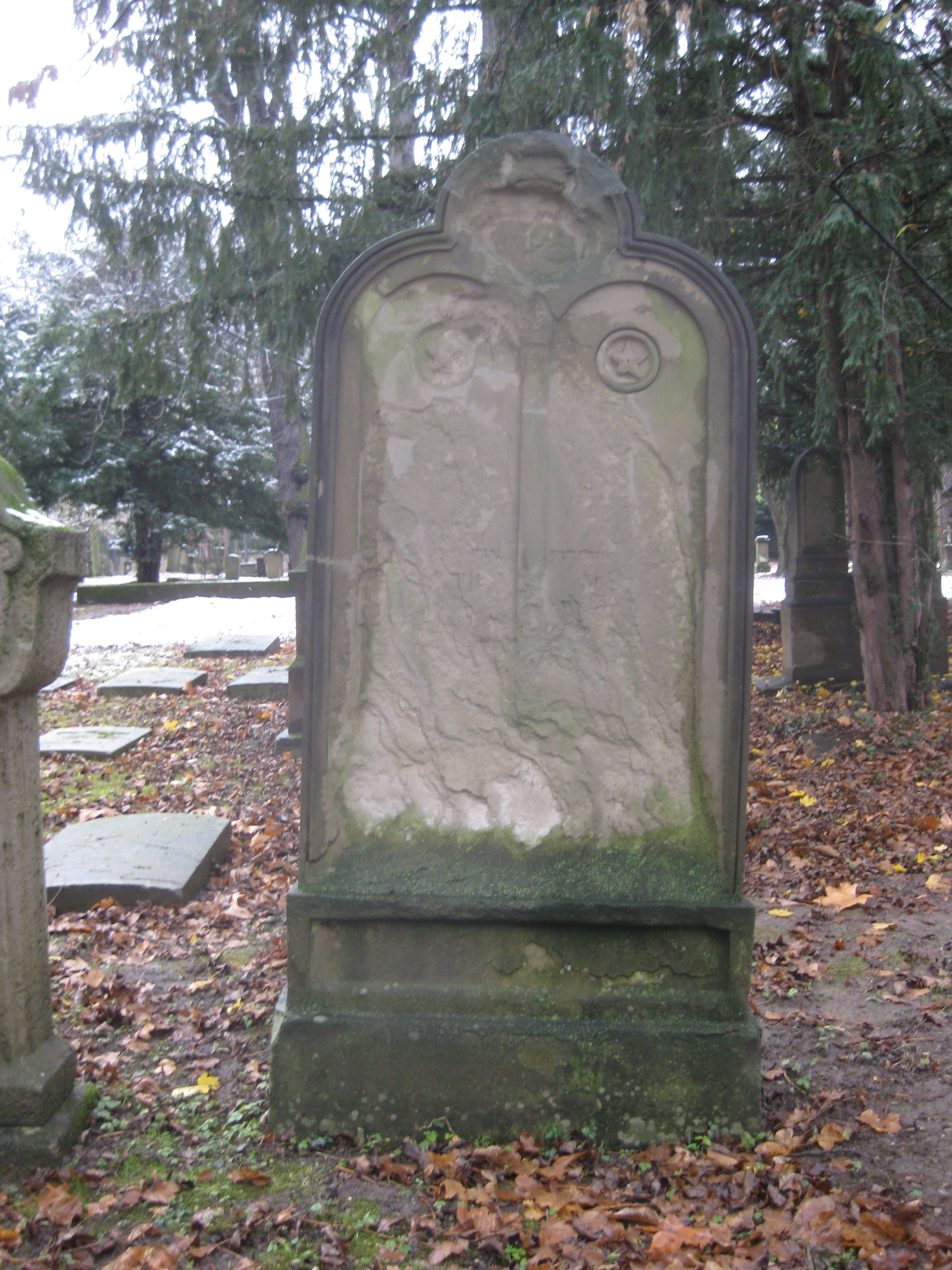
Zanth's grave in Stuttgart's Hoppenlauf Cemetery

Zanth died in Stuttgart at the age of 59 and found his final resting place in the Hoppenlauf Cemetery. However, the inscription on his gravestone has weathered beyond recognition.

== Publications ==
- with Jacques Ignace Hittorff: Architecture antique de la Sicile ou recueil des plus intéressans monumens d'architecture des villes et des lieux les plus remarquables de la Sicile ancienne, mesurés et dessinés par J. Hittorff et L. Zanth. Paris [1827] (Numerized).
- with Jacques Ignace Hittorff: Architecture moderne de la Sicile ou Recueil des plus beaux monumens religieux et des édifices publics et particuliers les plus remarquables de la Sicile, mesurés et dessinés par J. J. Hittorf et L. Zanth Architectes. Paris 1835.
- with Jacques Ignace Hittorff: Architecture antique de la Sicile. Recueil des monumens de Ségeste et de Sélinonte, mesurés et dessinés par J.-I. Hittorff & L. Zanth, Texte avec un atlas de 89 planches. Paris 1870 (Numerized)
- Die Wilhelma. Maurische Villa Seiner Majestät des Königes Wilhelm von Württemberg. Entworfen und ausgeführt von Ludwig von Zanth. Autenrieth’sche Kunsthandlung, Stuttgart 1855–1856 (Numerized).
