= Wilhelma =

Zoological-botanical garden in Stuttgart, Baden-Württemberg, Germany

Wilhelma Zoological-Botanical Garden Stuttgart
- (German: Wilhelma Zoologisch-Botanischer Garten Stuttgart)
- Logo of Wilhelma Zoo and Botanical Garden

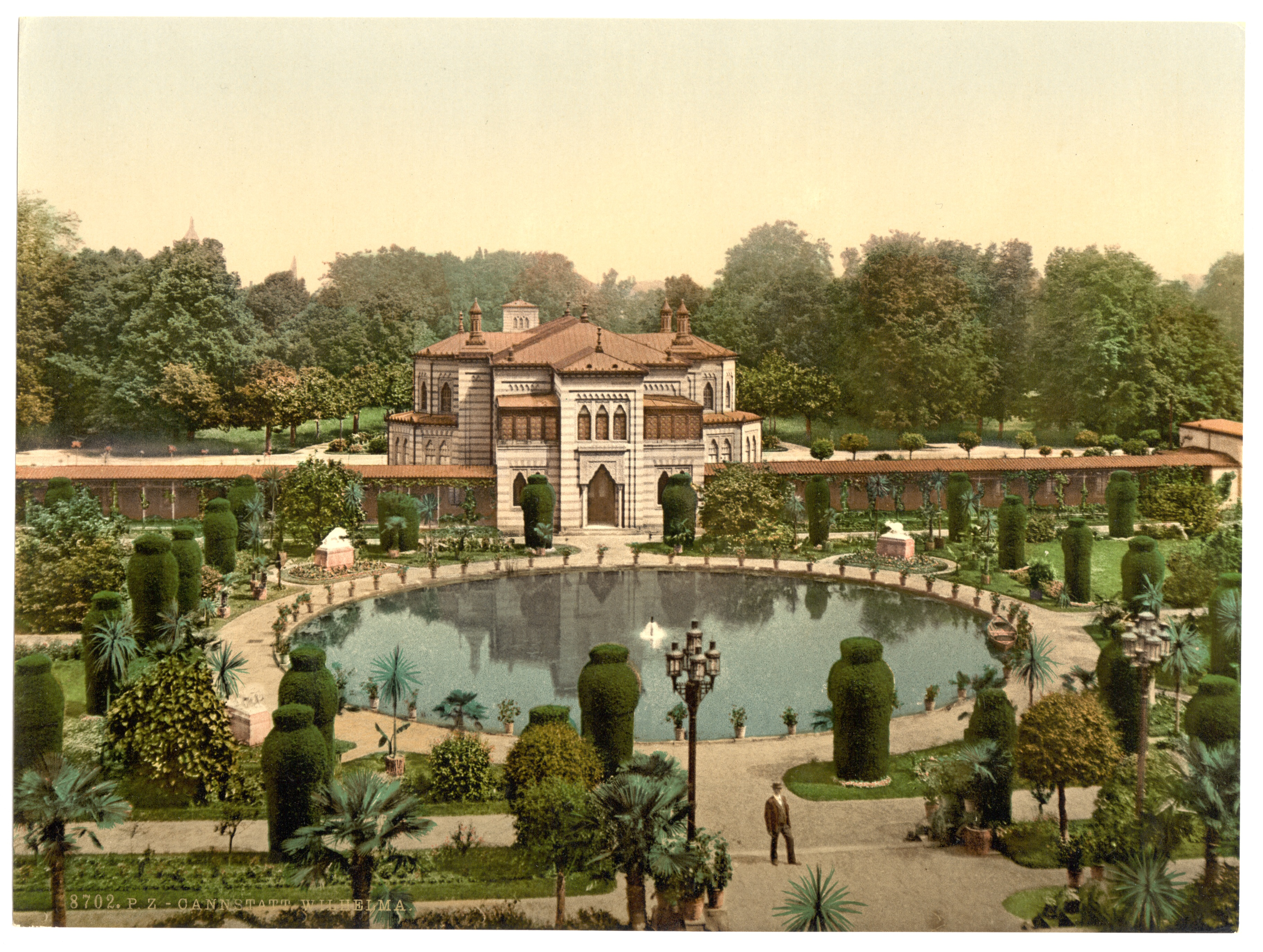
- Wilhelma Zoo circa 1900

- Location within Baden-Württemberg Location within Germany
- Alternative names: Schloss Wilhelma

General information
- Type: Zoo
- Architectural style: Moorish Revival
- Classification: Zoo
- Location: Bad Cannstatt District, Baden-Württemberg, Wilhelma 13, 70376 Stuttgart, Germany, Stuttgart, Germany
- Coordinates: 48°48′18″N 9°12′18″E
- Opened: 1919 (as a botanical garden), 1951 (first animal exhibit)
- Client: Wilhelma Zoo
- Owner: Baden-Württemberg, Ministry of Finance
- Landlord: Baden-Württemberg, Ministry of Finance
- Affiliation: Department of Real Estate and Buildings

Technical details
- Grounds: 30 ha (74 acres)

Design and construction
- Architect: Ludwig von Zanth
- Known for: Wilbär the polar bear, accidentally breeding of a virulent strain of Caulerpa taxifolia

Website
- www.wilhelma.de/en/

Wilhelma (German: [vɪlˈhɛlma]) is a zoological-botanical garden in Stuttgart, southern Germany, located in the Bad Cannstatt district in the north of the city on the grounds of a historic castle. Wilhelma Zoo is one of the most popular tourist destinations in Baden-Württemberg, seeing more than 2 million visitors annually.

The Zoo and Botanical Garden have been staffed since 1846. The Moorish Revival style echoing the Alhambra have been maintained and supplemented since 1960. Today, the zoo has an area of about 30 hectares (0.30 km^{2}), houses around 11,500 animals from around the world composed of roughly 1,200 species and roughly 6000 plants from all climates. Of Germany's zoos, Wilhelma's collection ranks second to the Berlin Zoological Garden. In addition to the public garden, Wilhelma also has a branch office located in Fellbach, where the zoo keeps its stallions.

Wilhelma receives gorilla juveniles rejected by their mother and reared by the zookeepers. At age 2–3, the gorillas are sent back to their original zoo(s).

== History ==
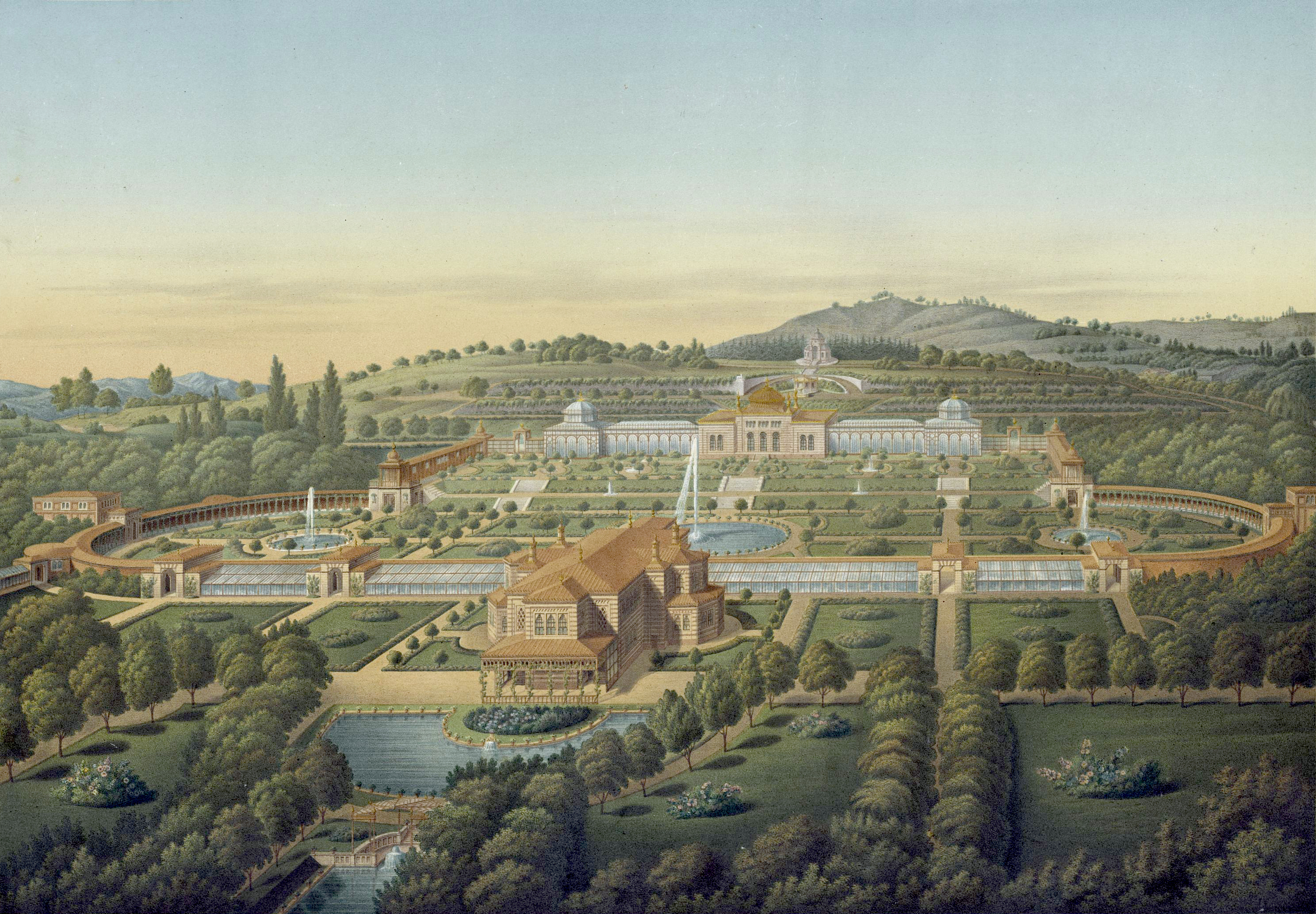
View of Wilhelma c. 1855. The Moorish villa and lakes are clearly visible.

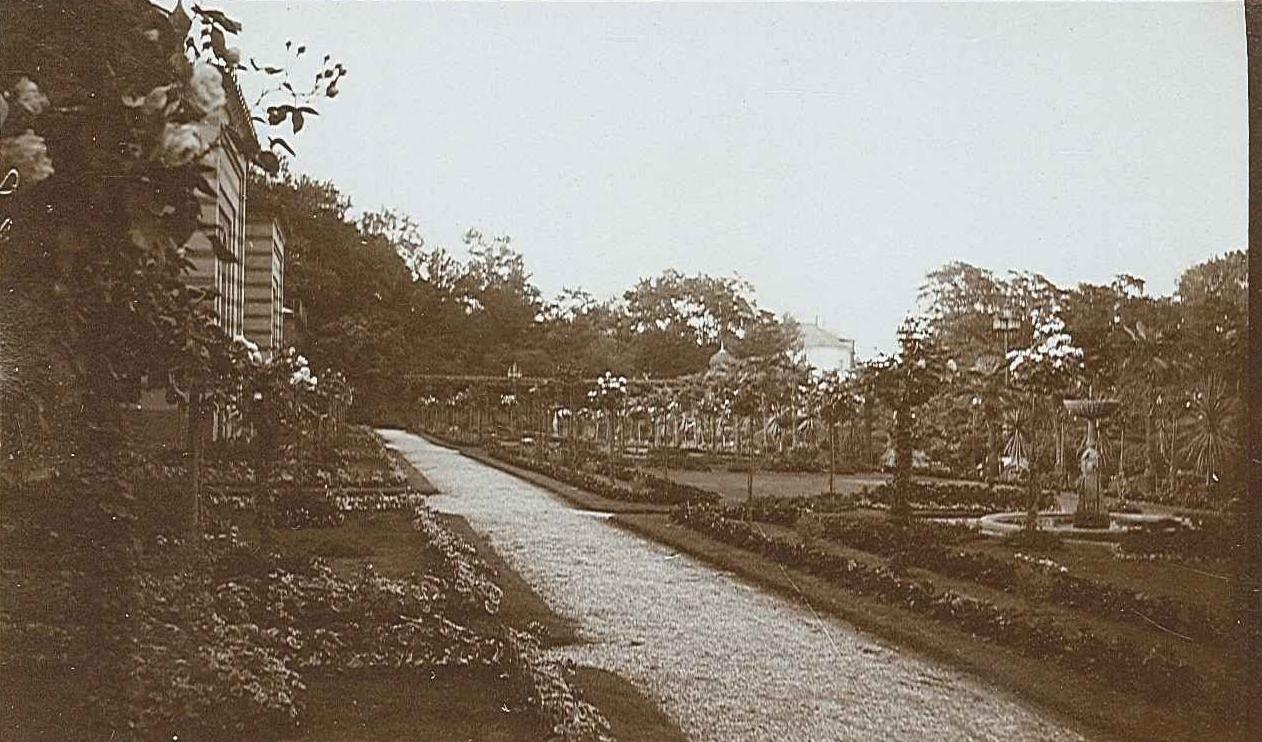
Gardens of Wilhelma c. 1912

=== Pre-Modern Wilhelma ===
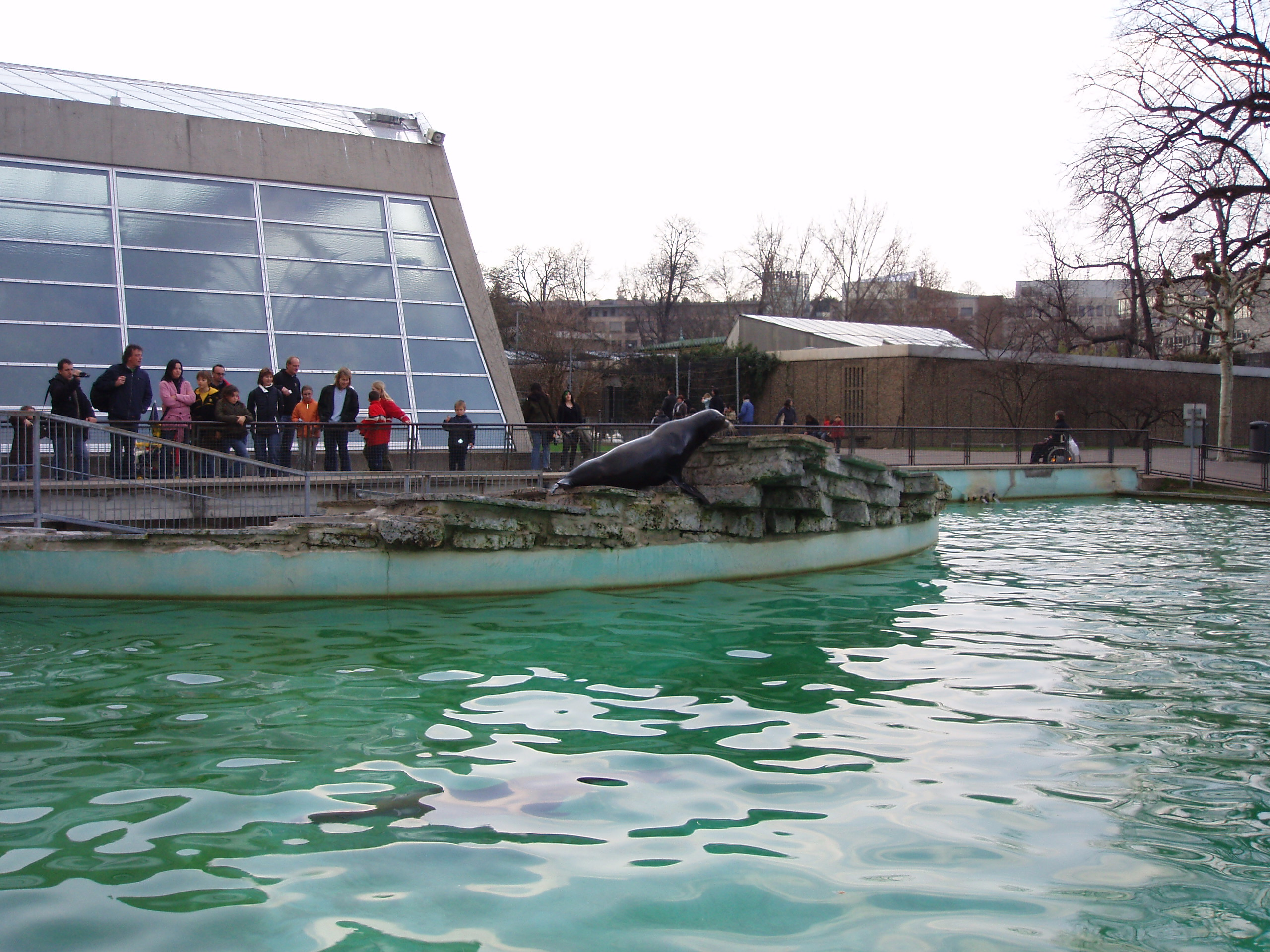
Sea lion pool, aquarium in background

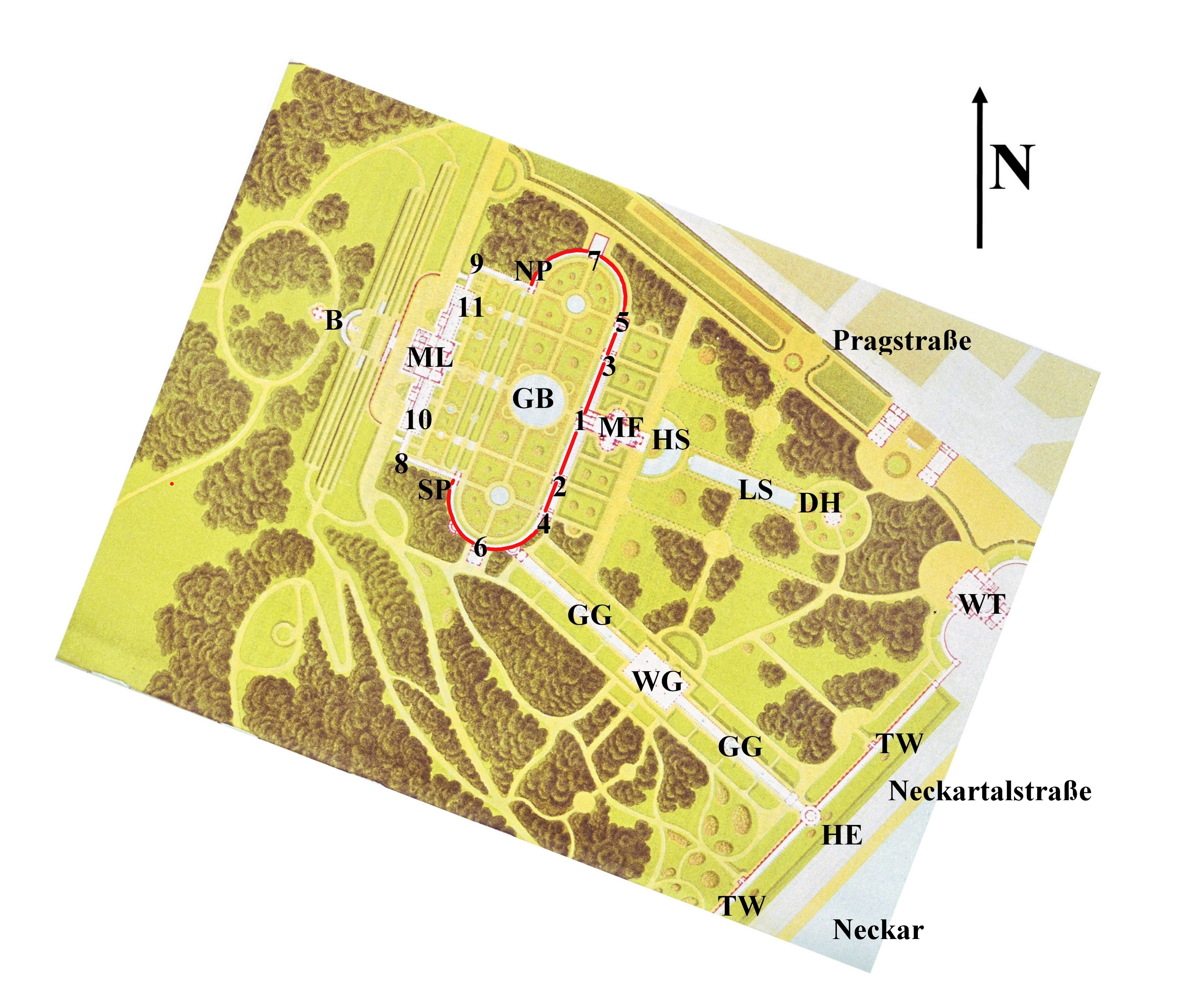
Plan of Wilhelma, 1855

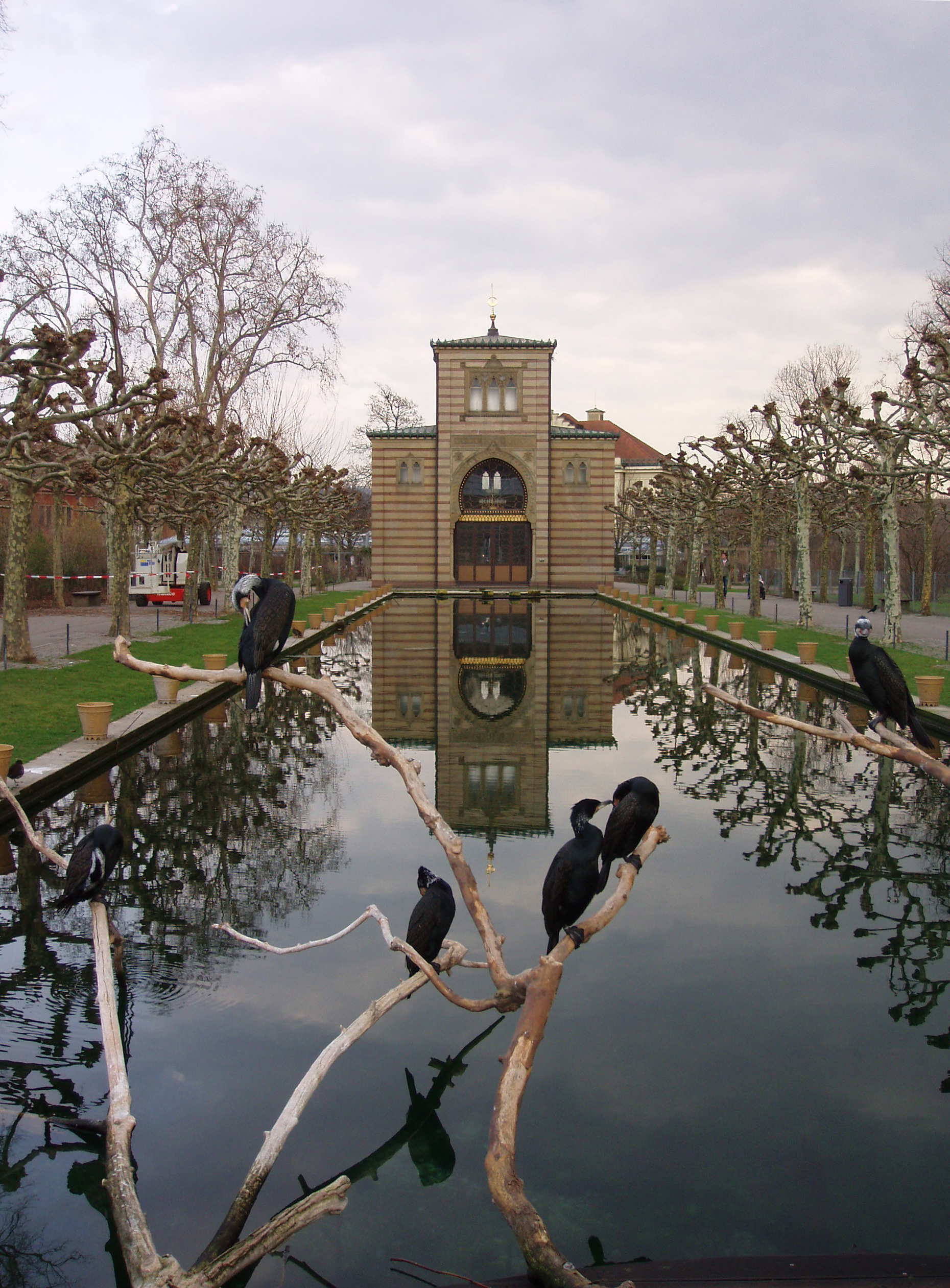
Cormorants before the Damascene Hall

In 1829, the property the zoo stood near the mineral springs on the Castle Rosenstein estate. Then Duke William I of Württemberg decided to build a royal bathhouse in the gardens. The Duke decided that the bathhouse should be built in the Moorish style in the same fashion as the Alhambra in the Spanish province of Granada, with an attached Orangery. Unfortunately, construction ground to a halt in 1816 due to economic woes caused by the Year Without Summer, so Wilhelma became just another summer residence of the Dukes and later Kings of Württemberg. Ludwig von Zanth was hired in 1837 to design and construct the Duke's bathhouse.

1842 saw the completion of the first few buildings of the Duke's bathhouse and the site received the name Wilhelma. The imaginative von Zanth knew how to fire up the Duke's mind and thus was able to complete the Duke's summer villa, which consisted of a residential building, a domed hall and two neighboring greenhouses, each with a corner pavilion. In 1846, the marriage between Charles I of Württemberg and Olga Nikolaevna of Russia was celebrated at Wilhelma, which by now had a banquet hall, two main building with several courtrooms, several gazebos, greenhouses and a large park. The cottage would be finished 20 years later.

=== Beginning of Modern Wilhelma ===
The abdication of King in 1918 saw Wilhelma pass into the possession of the city of Stuttgart and state of Baden-Württemberg. To this day it has been maintained by the Ministry of Finances. Wilhelma was opened to the public in 1919 as a botanical garden. A significant part of the zoo's income was the orchid collection, which brought in money by selling offspring from the garden (a practice at that time unique in Germany). The Imperial Garden Show of 1939 took place in Stuttgart at Wilhelma.

Wilhelma was badly damaged during World War II Allied bombing raids during the night of 19 and 20 October 1944. The Garden and Orangery suffered extensive damage; the plants that had not been moved prior to prevent their destruction were either destroyed or heavily damaged. The then director of the gardens, Albert Schöchle wanted to restore the gardens but also had an idea to once again incorporate animals on the property.

=== Establishment ===
1949 saw a reopening ceremony, featuring an aquarium. The following year, in 1950, a bird exhibit featuring cassowaries, pheasant, rheas, ostriches, and birds of paradise was unveiled. This exhibition was followed by Animals of the German Fairy Tale the same year, with such animals as brown bears, lions, and various reptiles, including anacondas, pythons, giant turtles, and crocodiles. Another exhibit, Animals of the Plains of Africa, once again featured lions and crocodiles, as well as various antelopes (such as waterbuck), zebras, wildebeest, and giraffes. An Indian jungle-inspired exhibit was the most successful exhibit to-date in the entire history of Wilhelma; the display included Asian elephants, Bengal tigers, Indian leopards, Asiatic black bears, and macaques. The state of Baden-Württemberg's Ministry of Finances ordered the animals from that exhibit removed; however, the order was never carried out. 1965 saw the founding of the Association of Friends and Supporters of Wilhelma.

=== Expansion ===
1960 was a good year for Wilhelma; the Stuttgart Council of Ministers approved expansions of the zoo, and this was approved by the Landtag of Baden-Württemberg 1961. New additions to the zoo included the renovation of King Wilhelm's Moorish villa into the exhibit for nocturnal animals in 1962, the construction of a new modern building and an aquarium in 1967, and buildings and exhibits for big cats, rhinos, and hippos in 1968. Then director Albert Schöchle retired in 1970 and was replaced by Wilbert Neugebauer. Under Neugebauer, a building for the zoo's monkeys completed in 1973, South American plants in 1977, hoofed African animals in 1982, Sub Tropics exhibit in 1981, and Youngstock House in 1982. Biologist Dieter Jauch became the third director in 1989, previously working as the curator of the aquarium. In Jauch's tenure, the previous system for bears and climbing animals was revised in 1991, the zoo's demonstration farm was completed in 1993, and a new aviary for the zoo's penguins and kangaroo enclosure were completed in the same year. Wilhelma's Amazon House was finished in 2000, the insectarium in 2001, the Bongo exhibit was expanded in 2003, Crocodile Hall was renovated in 2006, the Elephant enclosure was renovated in 2012, the meerkat hall was finished in 2013, and the African Apes Hall was opened that same year. Further work by Jauch included a new outdoor terrarium and the expansion of the bison enclosure in 2013. Thomas Kölpin became director in 2014. His tenure saw the conclusion of the renovation of the old palace into the nocturnal animals hall (1962–2014) with the aim to build an entirely new building for the zoo's nocturnal animals in Elephant Park, and the finishing of the small animals house (1968–2014).

=== Current use ===
By 1993, Wilhelma reached its current size. A new ape house was opened in May 2013 (construction cost 22 million euros). The redesigned exterior of the elephant enclosure was completed in April 2012. To make room for even more elephants, the rhinos will be moving to their previous enclosure. A new hippo plant on the Neckar with a new pedestrian crossing is in development. A collaboration with the Neckar-Käpt'n and the National Museum of Natural History on this topic is being discussed. Construction will connect Wilhelma to Stuttgart 21 and B10 tunnel; Wilhelma will serve as a railroad stop on the B10 route. Construction is to begin in September 2015. Another 20 year bill granting funds for further expansion to Wilhelma was put up for consideration by the Ministry of Finances was approved July 2015.

== Exhibits ==
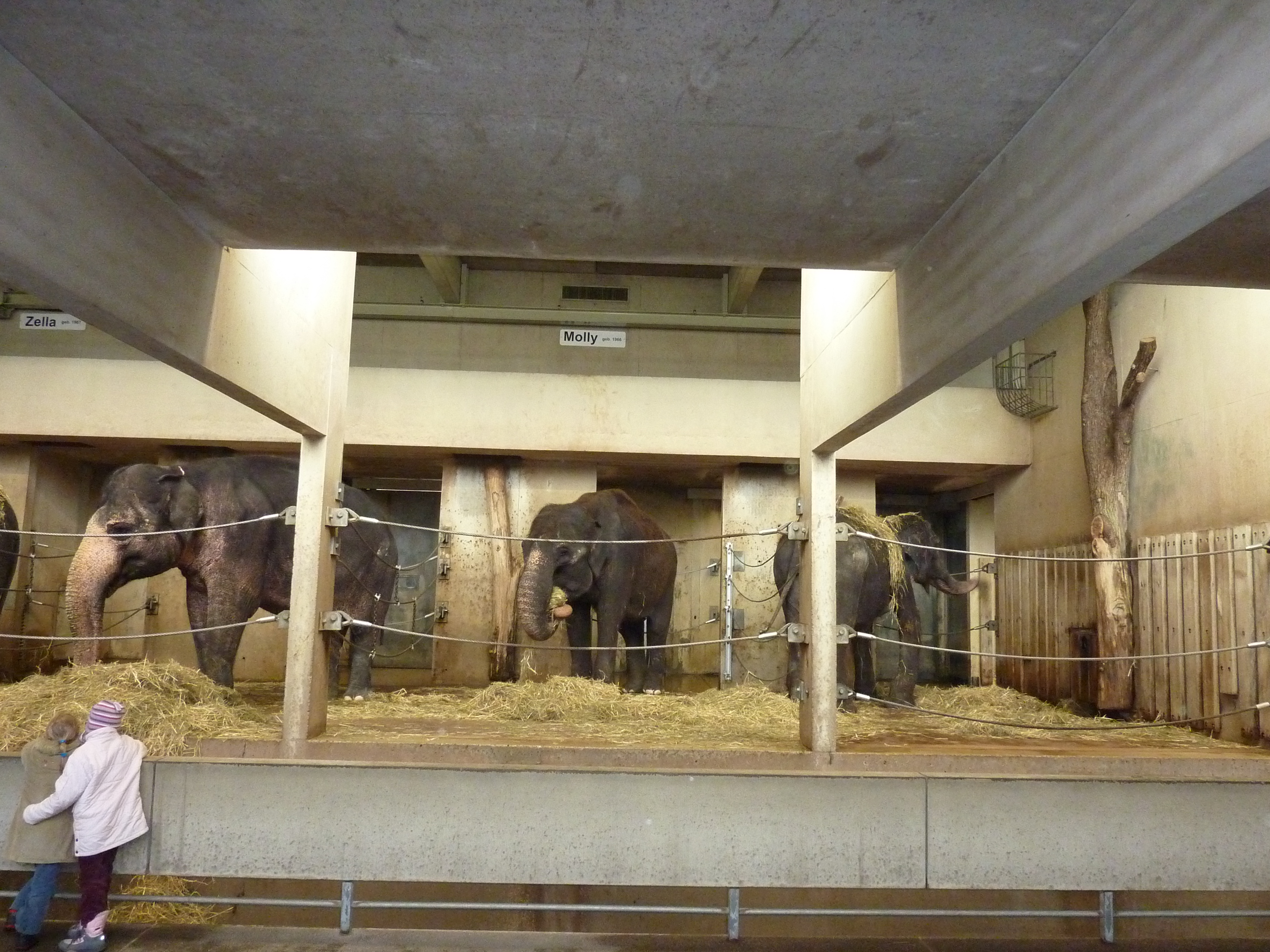
Elephant House

=== Pachyderms ===
The elephant and rhinoceros houses were completed in 1968, and ropes were later installed in 1990 to replace former chains. The grounds of both buildings were redesigned in 2012 to include more trees and an animal-friendly pool, increasing its total size to 830 square metres (8,900 ft^{2}). In addition, a clay wallow and two basins with interchangeable substrates (e.g. bark mulch, gravel.) were added. Currently, there are two living elephants at Wilhelma: Pama (b. 1966) and Vella (b. 1967). Previous elephants included Vilja, the oldest living elephant in Europe, whom died 10 July 2010 (cause of death is thought to be circulatory collapse), and Molly, whom was euthanized for health reasons in July 2011, at the age of about 45 years. Other elephants at the zoo include the African elephant (Loxodonta africana) Jumbo and, briefly, a bull Asian elephant (Elephas maximus) sent by the Indian state as a gift to Stuttgart. Another construction project, to improve the lion exhibit, was announced during a speech; work was projected to begin in 2020.

Wilhelma's Indian one-horned rhinos (Rhinoceros unicornis), housed in the same building as the elephants, include: Bruno, a bull, raised in Cologne, and (until 2019) Sani, a female whom was given to Wilhelma by the Nepalese state as a gift in 1993. Together, they make up the zoo's current breeding pair. Before them, Wilhelma's breeding pair of Indian rhinoceroses were Nanda and Puri.

The Tapir House, built in the expansion era in 1968, houses a pygmy hippopotamus (Hexaprotodon liberiensis) bull named Hannibal and the common hippos (Hippopotamus amphibious) Rosi and Maik, as well as African warthogs (Phacochoerus africanus). The building also currently houses Malayan tapir (Tapirus indicus) and babirusa (Babyrousa sp).

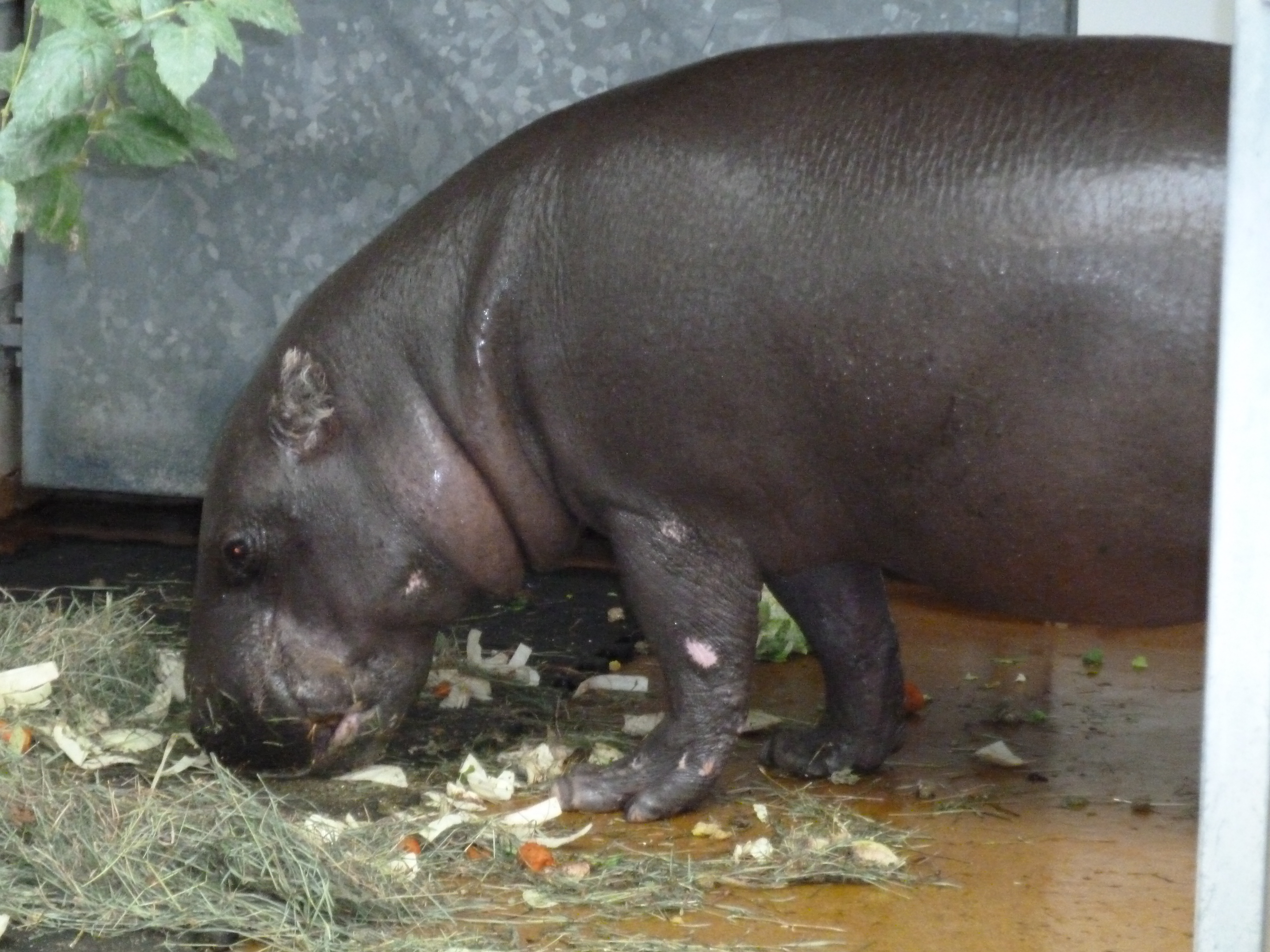
The senior bull pygmy hippo, Hannibal

=== Ungulates ===
The plant complex for African ungulates which includes the giraffe house, was opened 1980th Today there live zebras, giraffes, kudus, okapi, Dorcas gazelle and Somali wild ass. Wilhelma has been very successful in the breeding of giraffes, Somali wild asses, bongos, okapi, bontebok and zebras. Since 1989, a total of 12 okapi have arrived at Wilhelma. In the giraffe house there are not only the indoor enclosure of giraffe and okapi, but also the home of Congo peacocks, Fennec foxes, short-eared elephant shrews and weaver birds. Former residents include Grant's zebras, shoebills, porcupines, klipspringers, waterbucks, warthogs and numerous antelopes.

The "Ranch" that borders the Tapir House, new Ape House, and excavation site of the tunnel to Castle Rosenstein, was built as a temporary holding area in the 1980s. It houses takins and the zoo's bison, and an onager.

=== Primates ===
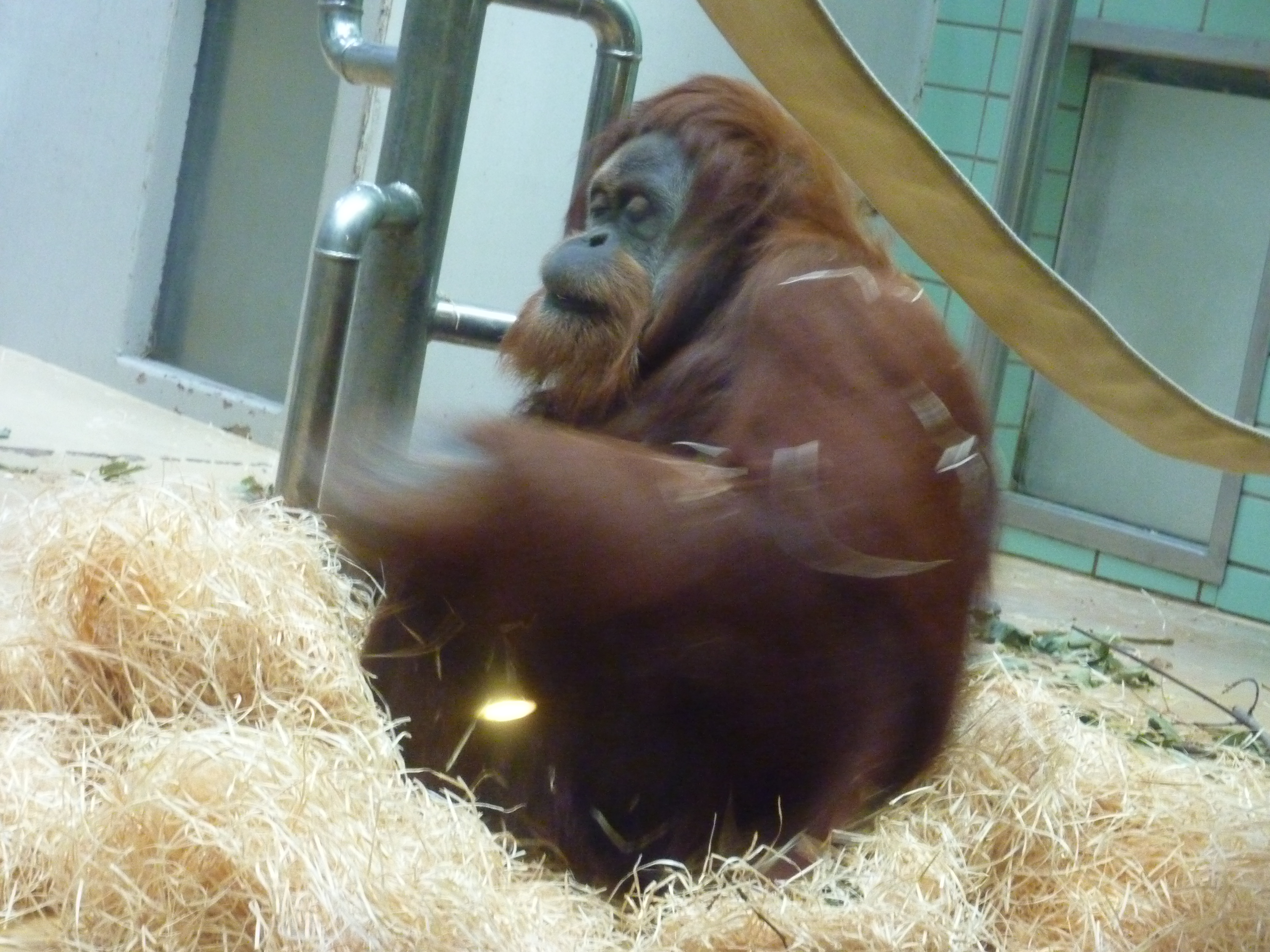
Old Ape House

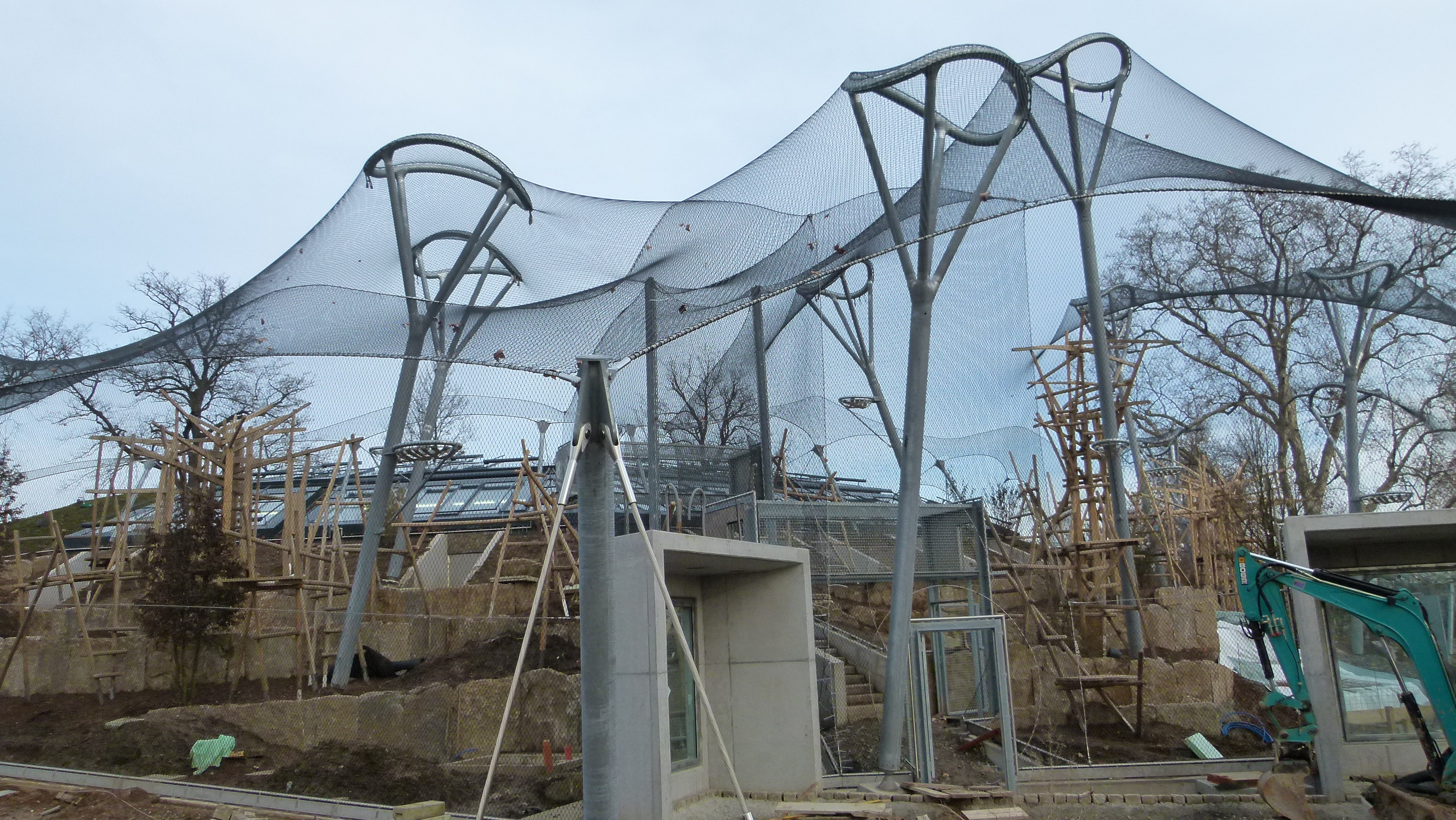
Construction of the outdoor area, 2012

The old Ape House, opened in 1973, was one of the most modern of its kind at the time. The building's design, since copied by numerous other zoos and again mimicked in the new ape house, was characterized by features like the carousel-style design of the enclosure and the tiles that line them and the specialized support disks that allowed increased force distribution. The last two chimpanzees at Wilhelma were acquired in the summer of 2010 due to European Endangered Species Programme drive begun at Veszprém. Since the opening of the new ape house, the old house has been used exclusively for the zoo's orangutans. In 2011, it was announced that the zoo wished to remodel the enclosures of the orangutans, lutungs and gibbons.

When the old ape house (built in 1973) no longer met international standards, Wilhelma had to build a new ape house. In Spring of 2010, the project began to not only meet international standards, but to also include housing for gorillas and bonobos in an outdoor area. The new building, 13 times the size of the original structure at 4,500 square metres (48,000 ft^{2}), was opened to the public on 14 May 2013. Construction of the New Ape House wound up costing the zoo about 22 million euros, 70% more than the original 9.5 million euros financed towards the project. The unfortunate deaths of two bonobos thanks to malfunctioning components in the ventilation system have called the construction quality of the building into question.

The Monkey facility, opened in 1973, now houses both gibbons and lutungs. Here, Wilhelma's breeding program for the Slim monkey is remarkable among other zoos in the world at 37 new pups. 2015 saw some remodeling done to the gibbons enclosure for visitor convenience. The building has housed Proboscis monkeys, Lion-tailed macaques, Drills, Doucs, and Spider and Capuchin monkeys.

Since 1975, two other structures for (originally) housing primates were reconstructed. The larger of the two now houses Geladas, hyraxes, and Barbary sheep. The other still houses Japanese macaques.

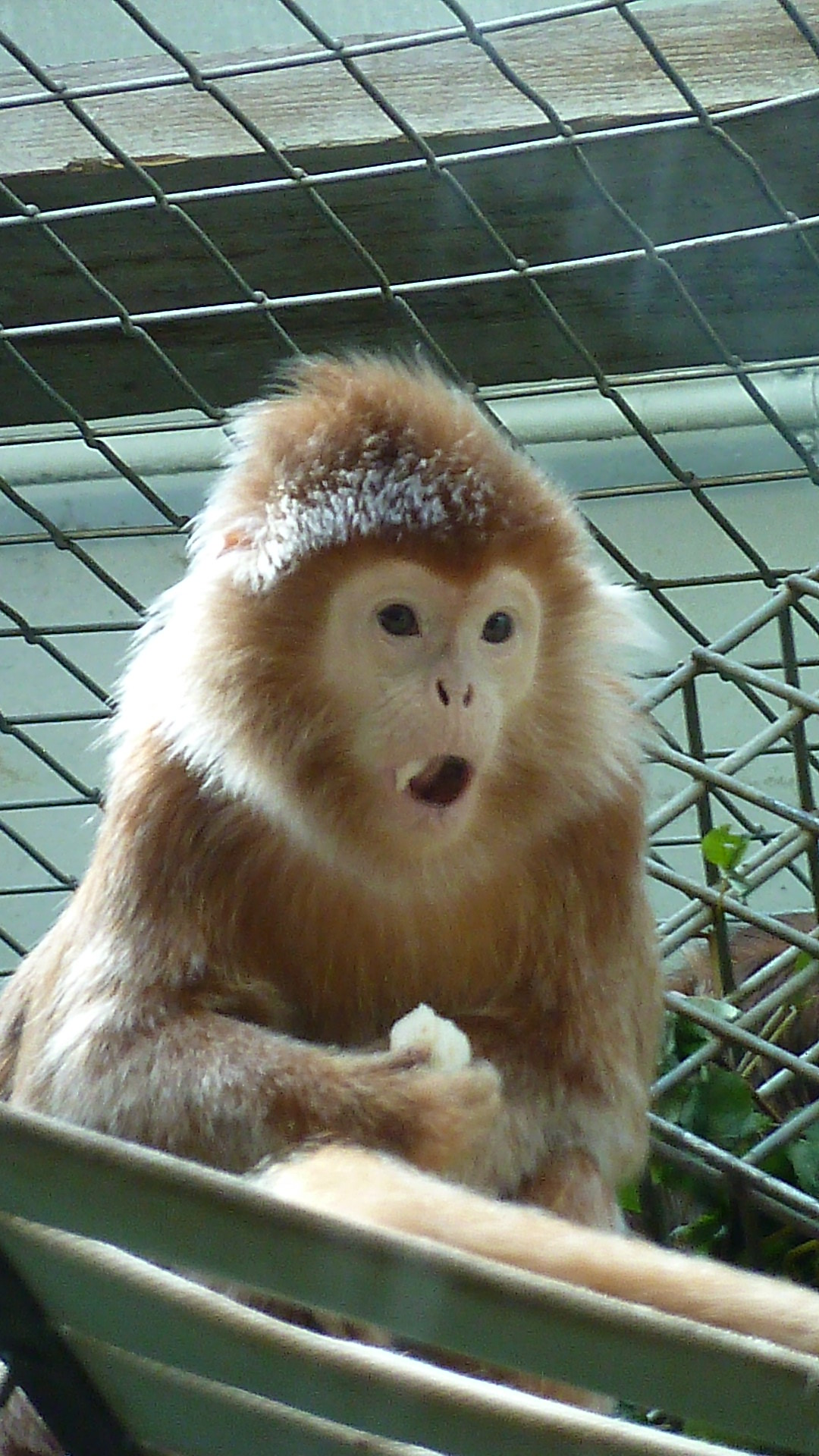
Javan lutung in the Monkey Hall

=== Birds ===
The first major expansion to Wilhelma's collection of birds began with the Sub Tropics Aviary in 1981 that houses kookaburras, Marbled ducks, Northern bald ibises, numerous species of parrot. A special feature of the aviaries is the only New Zealand kaka outside of New Zealand and the first successful breeding of a Kea in Germany. Due to the strain put on the historic wall of the Sub Tropic Aviary by the New Ape House, a new project for a larger aviary is pending.

There are several aviaries behind Damascene Hall that were once used for Pheasantry when Wilhelma was still a palace for the King of Württemberg. In the post war period, these were used for housing small predatory animals including Canines, small cats, and civets. Since the restoration of the aviaries in the 1990s, they now hold native birds such as partridges, Eurasian bullfinches, sparrows, and various pigeon species. In 2015, a modification was made to these aviaries to house capercaillies for Wilhelma's in situ participation of Species protection in the Black Forest region.

For the 1993 World Horticultural Exposition, a new enclosure for African penguins (who had been at Wilhelma since 1953) to replace their old habitat in the Garden's ponds near the Moorish villa adjacent to the bird aviary. There also were located Humboldt, Rockhopper, Gentoo, and King penguins. Public feedings occur daily.

In 1993, an aviary for birds from all over the world was constructed. Included are Black storks, ibises, Great hornbills, and an Asian and Australian community aviary that contains a Microbat exhibit and feeding kitchen.

Wilhelma's collection of cranes began with a bird exhibition in 1950: Redcrowned, Blue, and White-naped cranes and also a Hawaiian goose joined Wilhelma. Birds that used to have a presence at the zoo include other types of cranes, shoebills, geese, and curiously a Brush kangaroo.

== Trivia ==
- The aquarium staff was responsible for inadvertently breeding a strain of Caulerpa taxifolia or "Killer Algae", a highly invasive species of algae which has had "severe negative consequences for biodiversity".
- Wilhelma Zoo is Europe's only large combined zoological and botanical garden.
- The upper section of the zoo includes an impressive stand of sequoia trees.
- The botanical gardens contain Europe's biggest magnolia grove.
- Wilhelma adjoins a public park to its west laid out in the 'English landscape style' of rolling grass and informal groups of trees; this perfectly complements the landscape of the zoo.
- Wilhelma has a branch department in Fellbach where it keeps Stallions.
- Wilhelma is the only state owned zoo in Germany.
- Wilhelma is a member of WAZA and EAZA organisations.

== Gallery ==
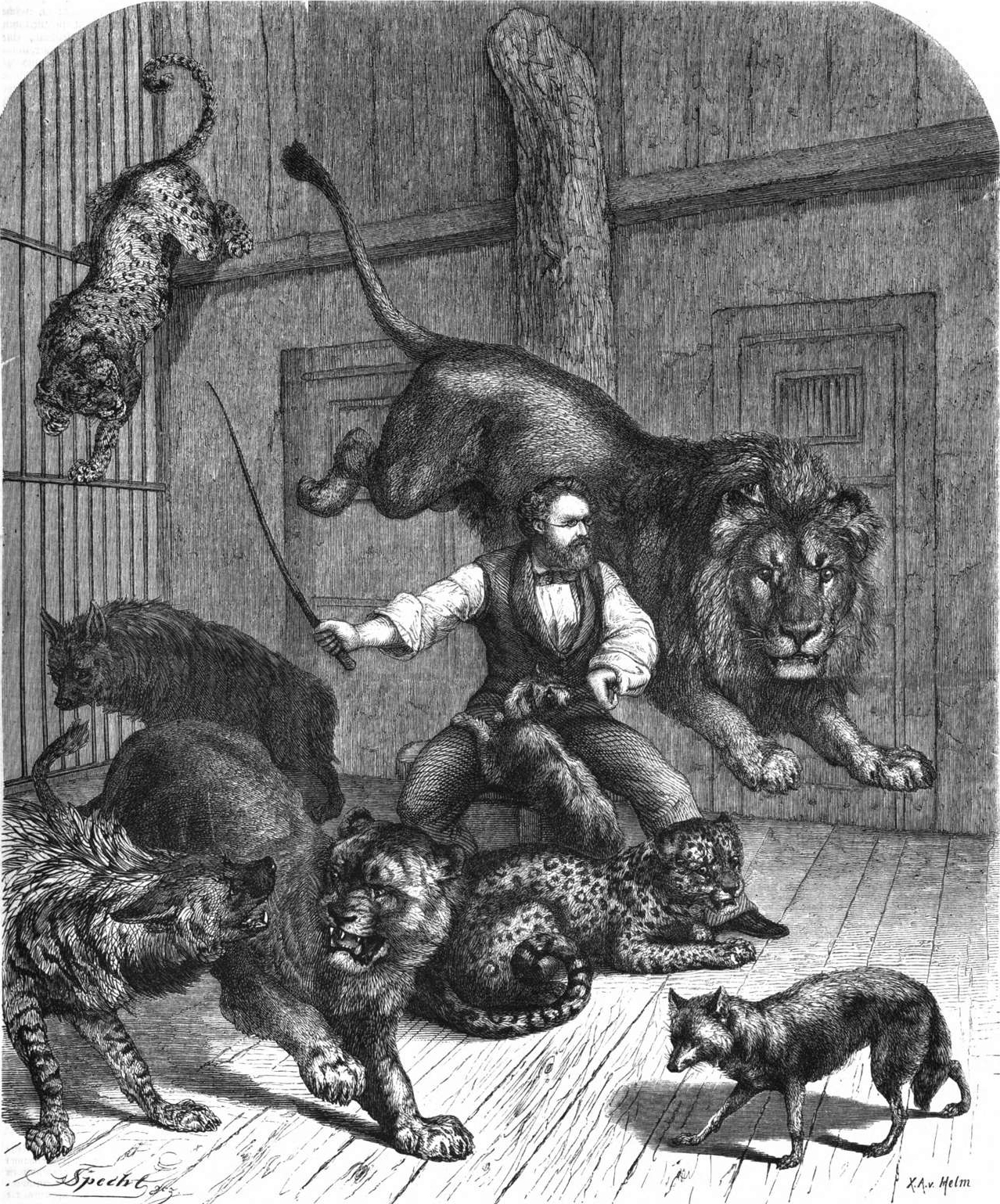
Gustav Werner in the Lion's Cage

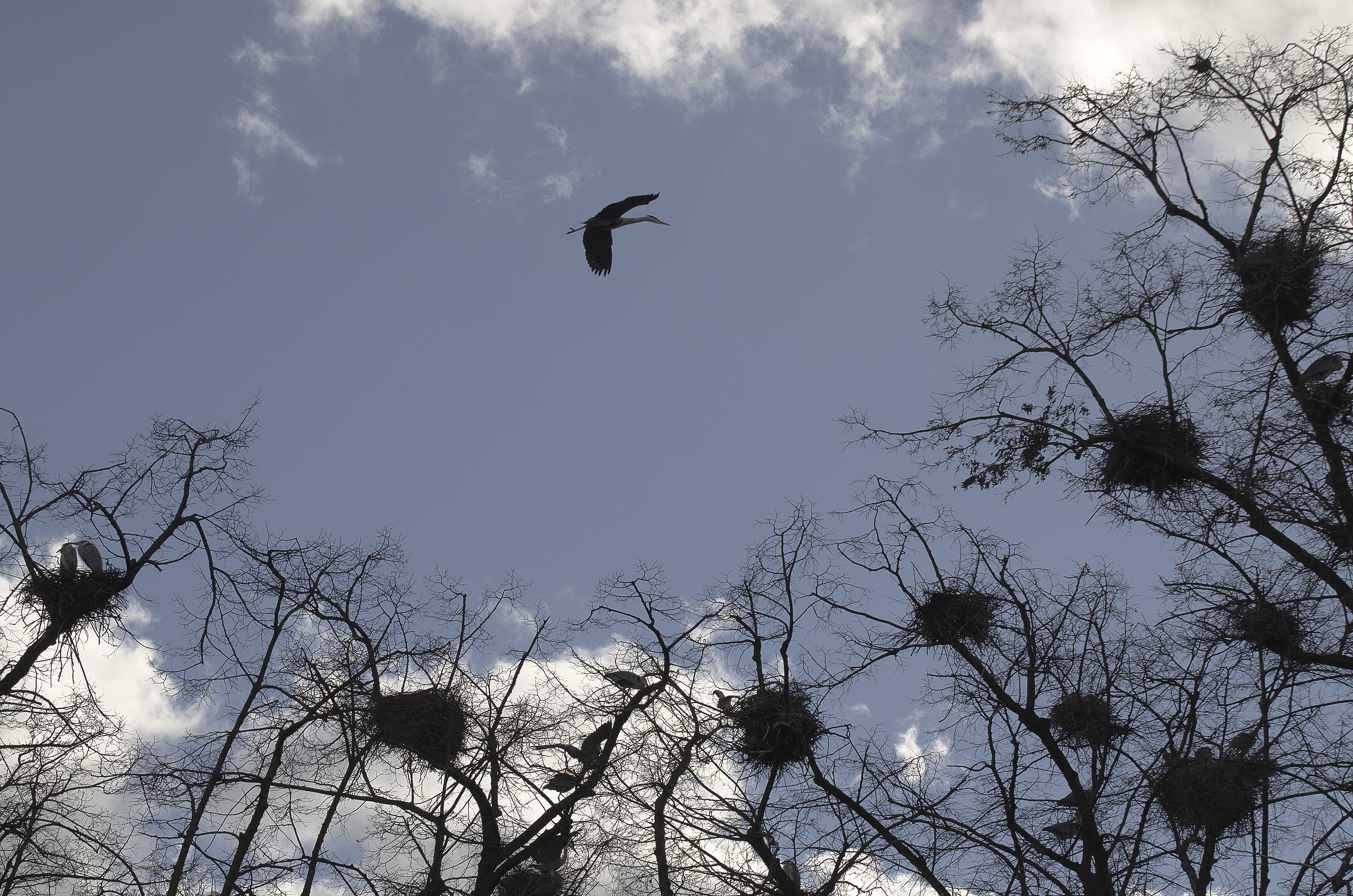
Grey herons in a tree at the entrance

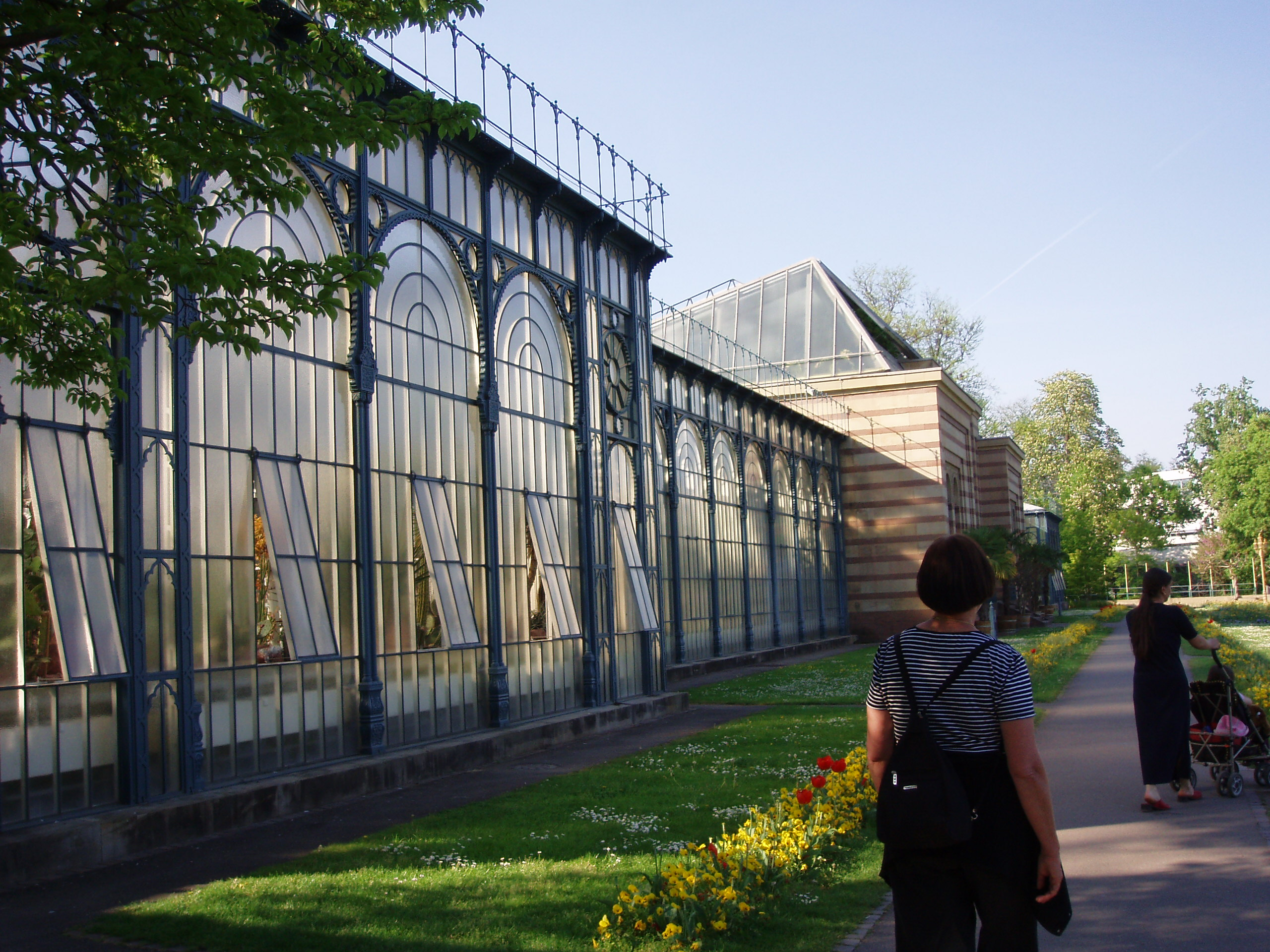
The green- and nocturnal house

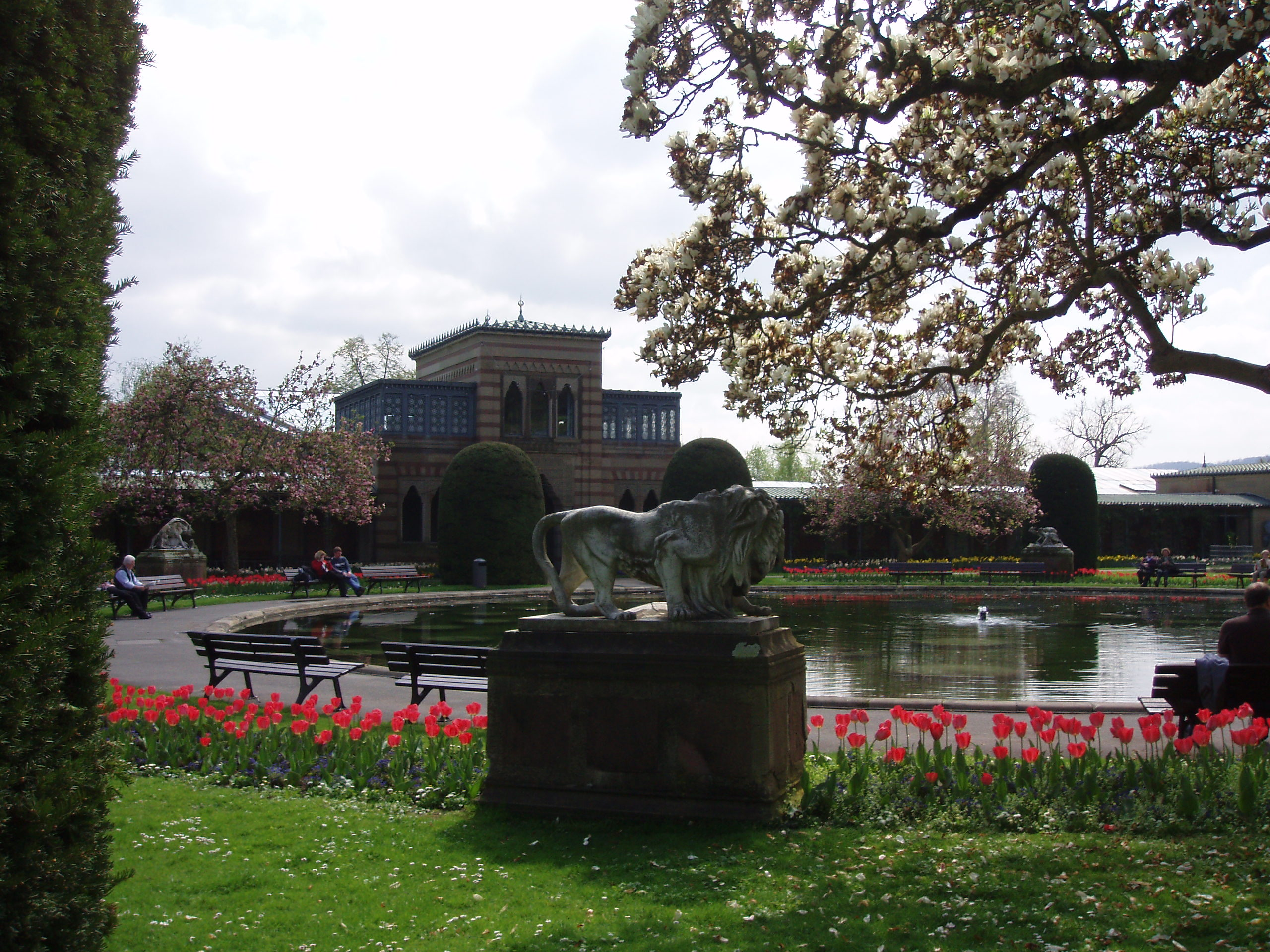
Nymphaea Pond in spring

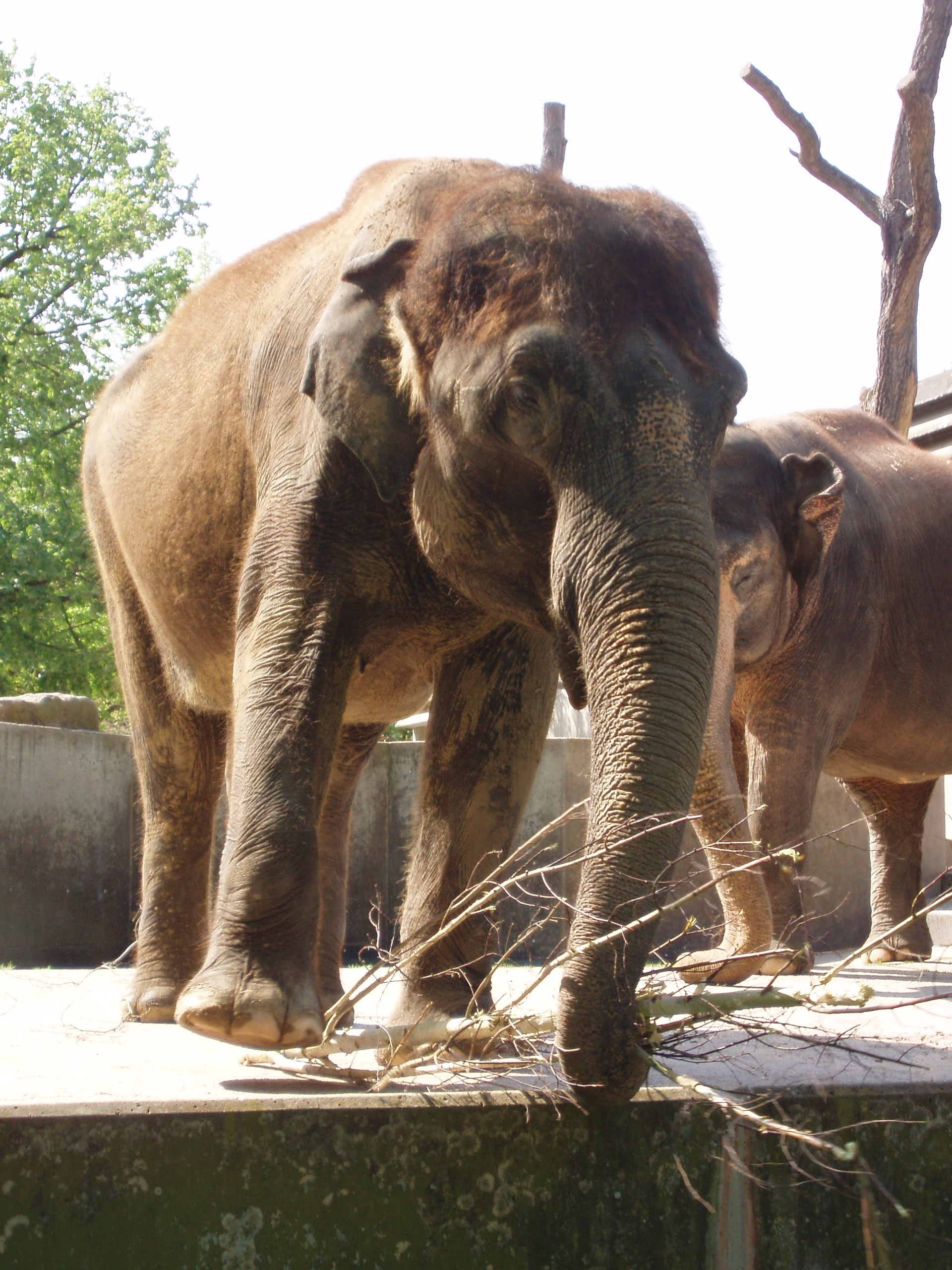
Asian elephant

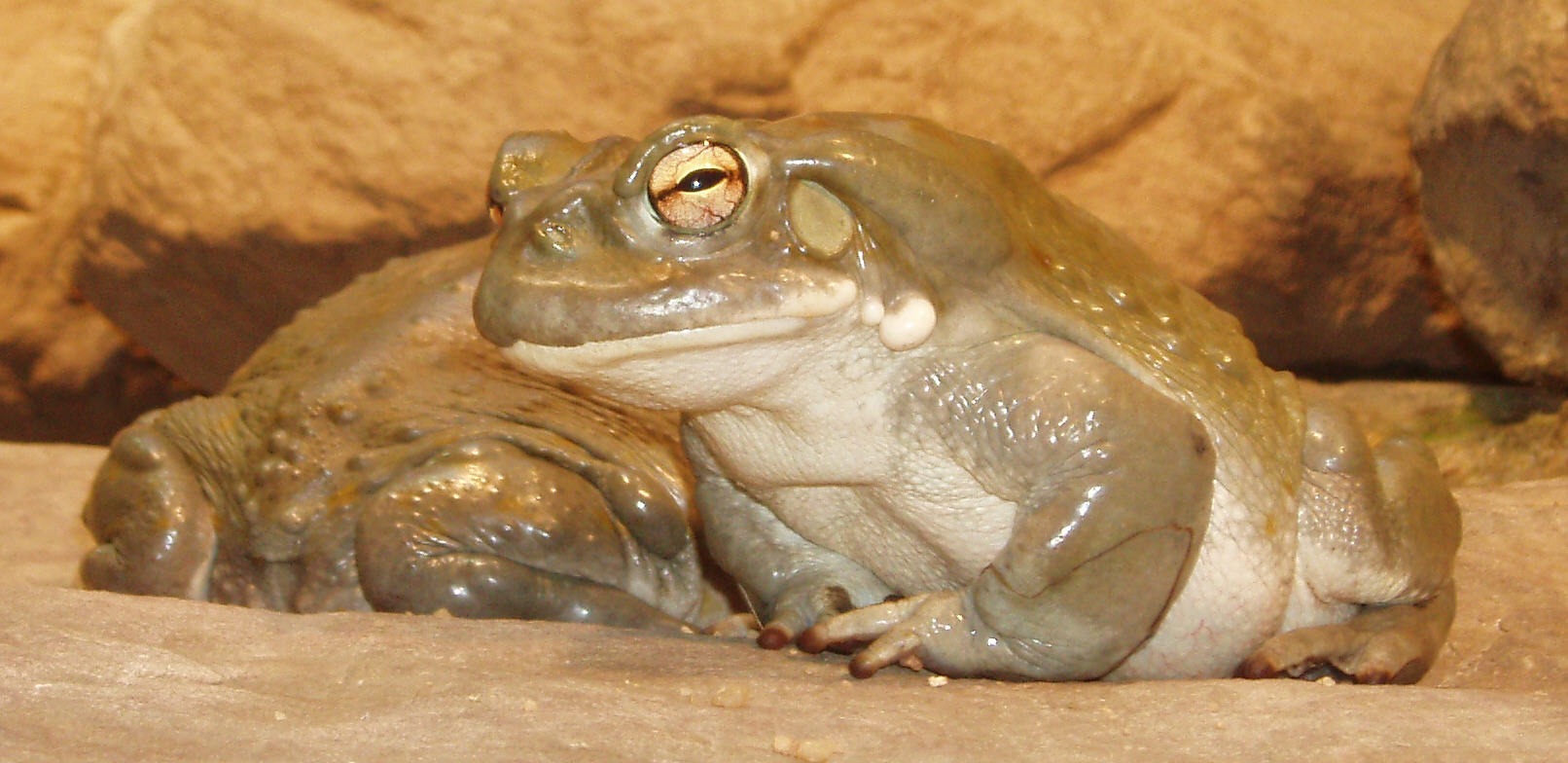
Colorado River toad

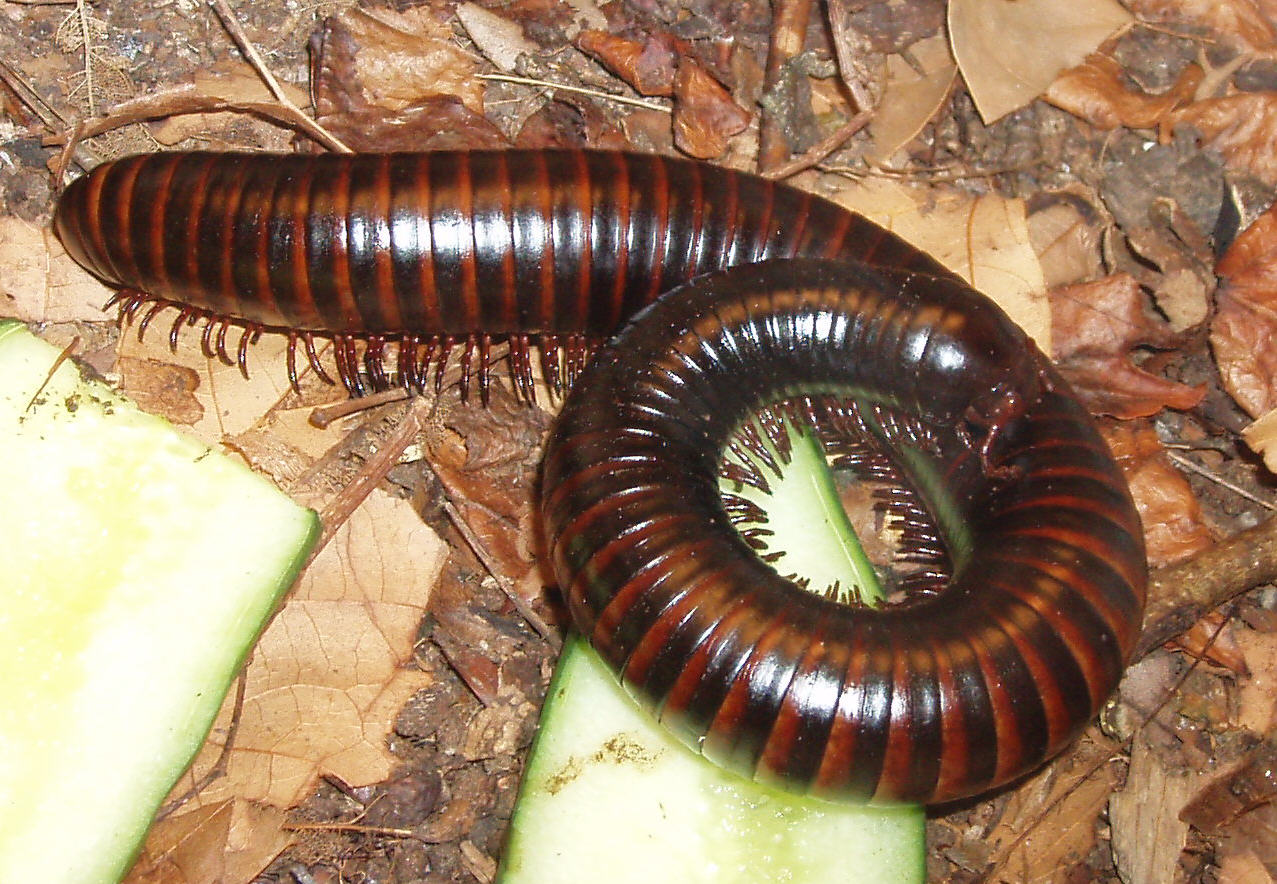
Giant millipede

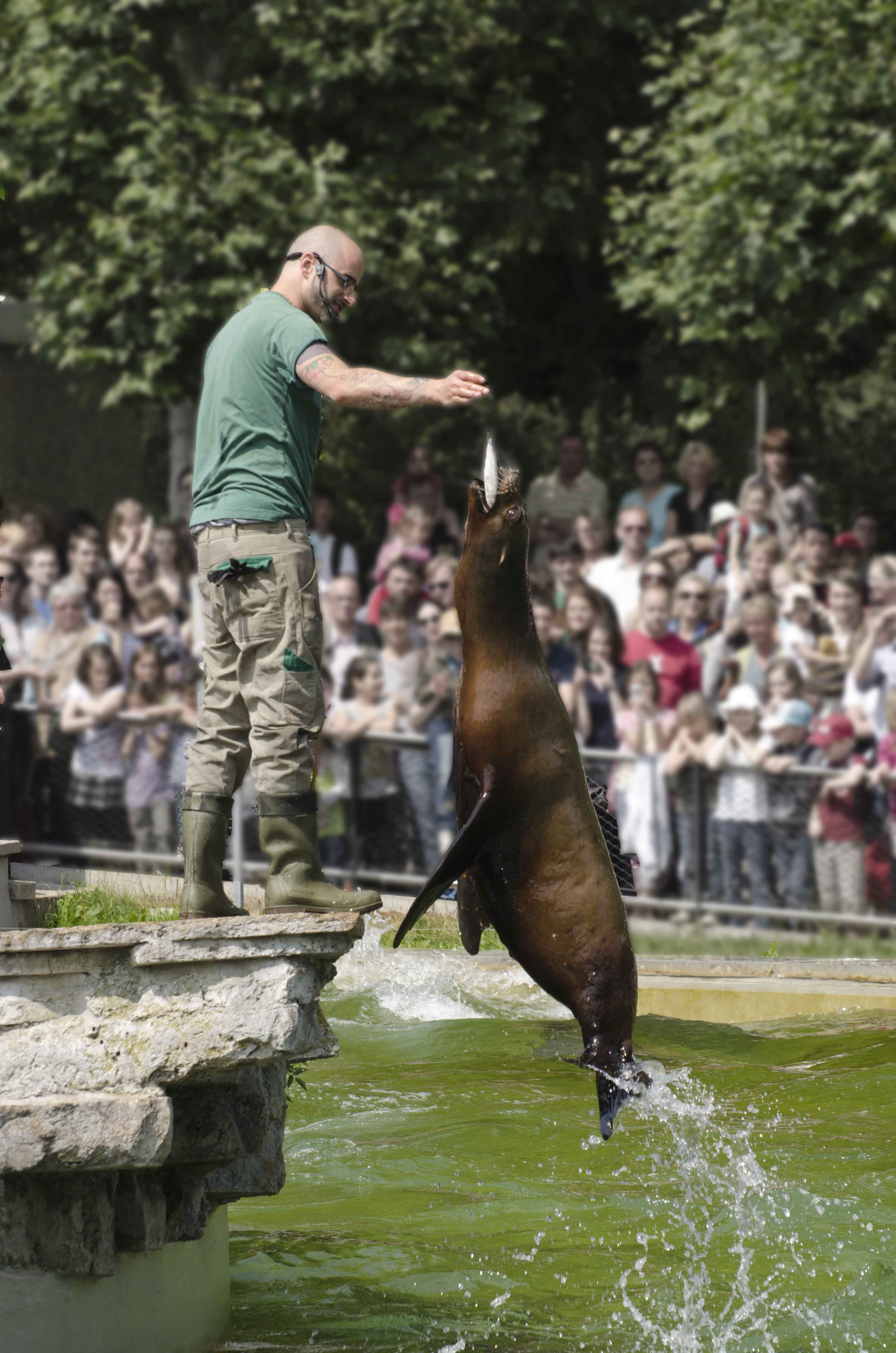
California sea lion

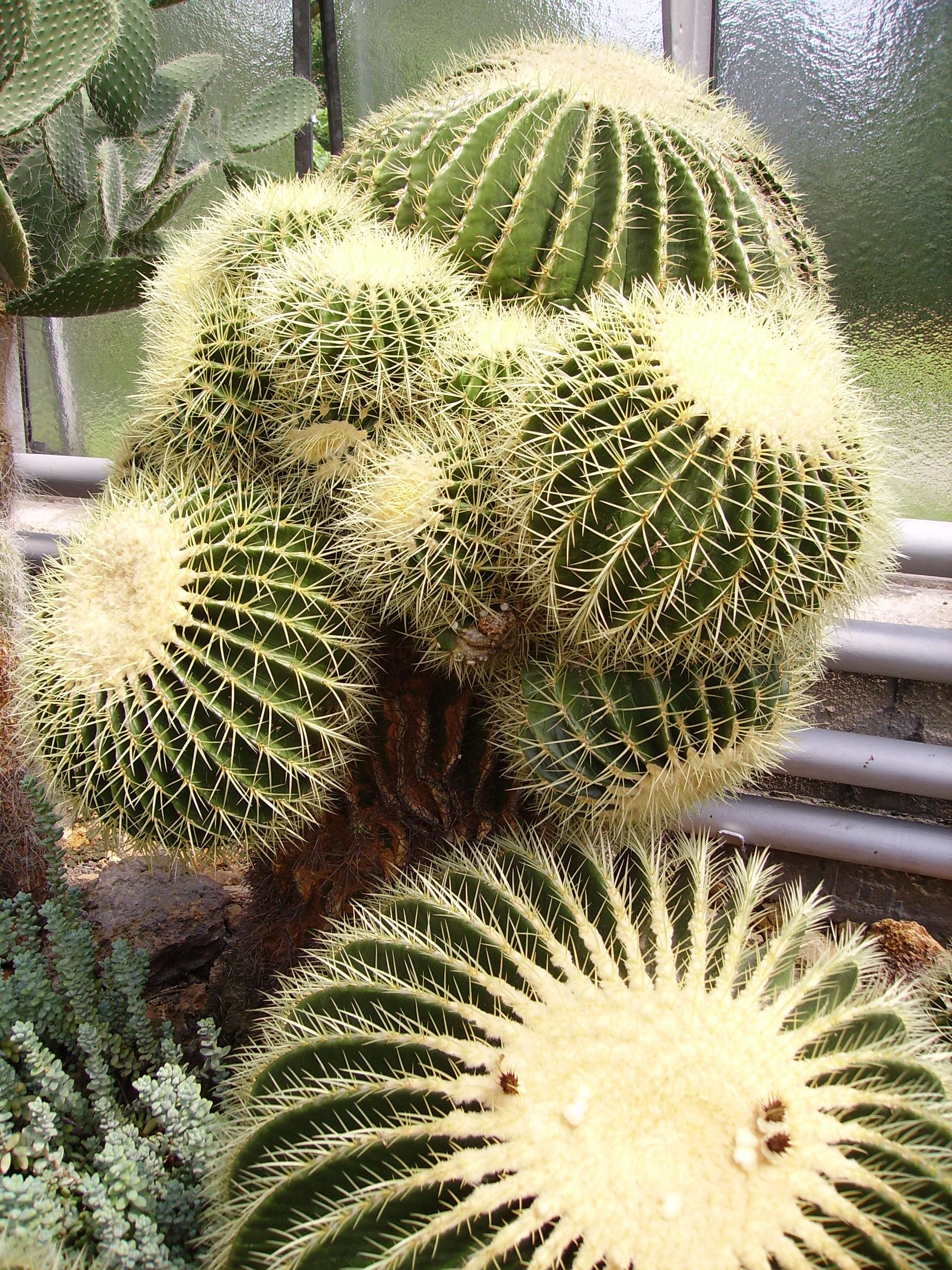
Echinocactus grusonii

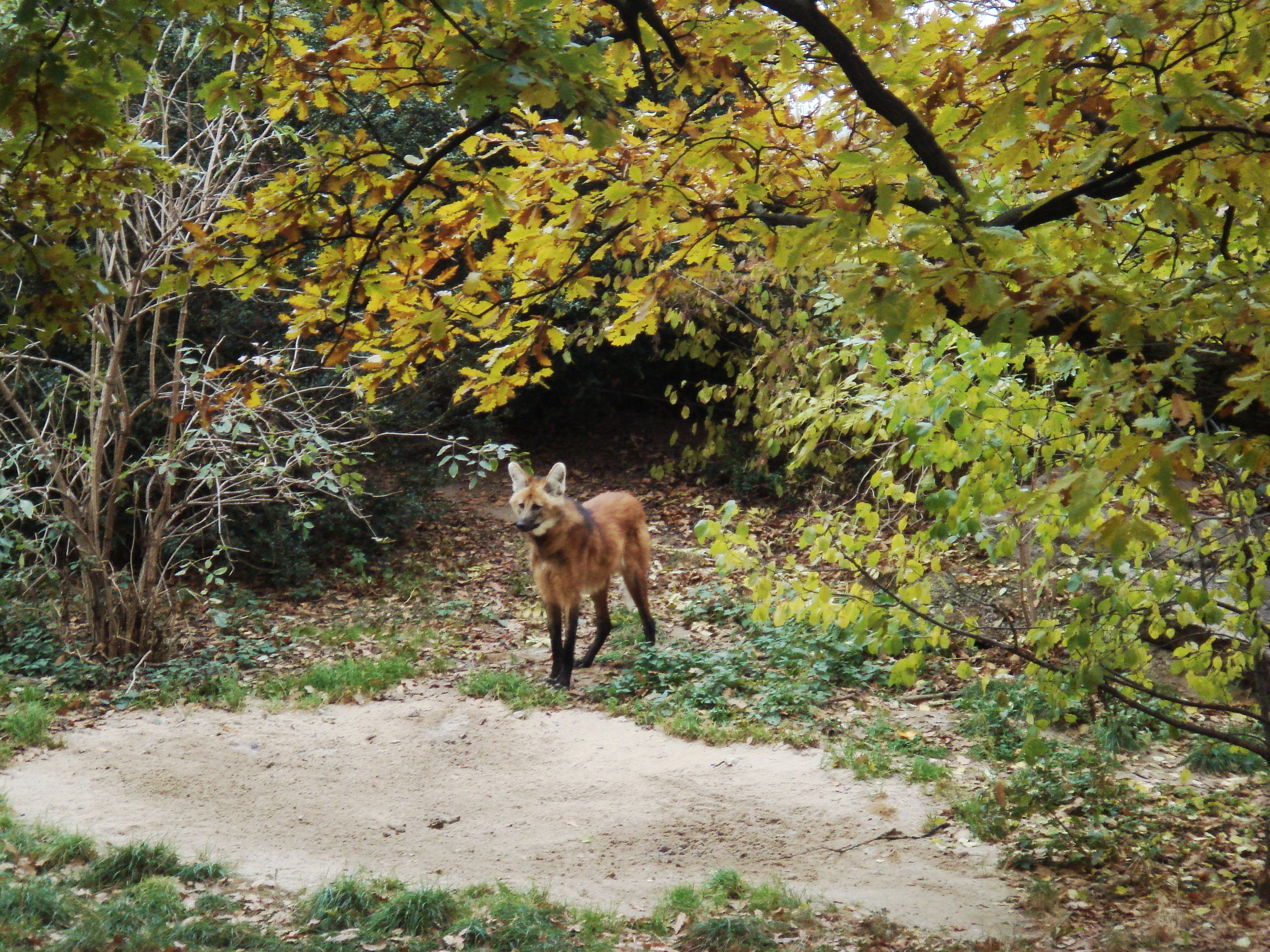
Maned wolf

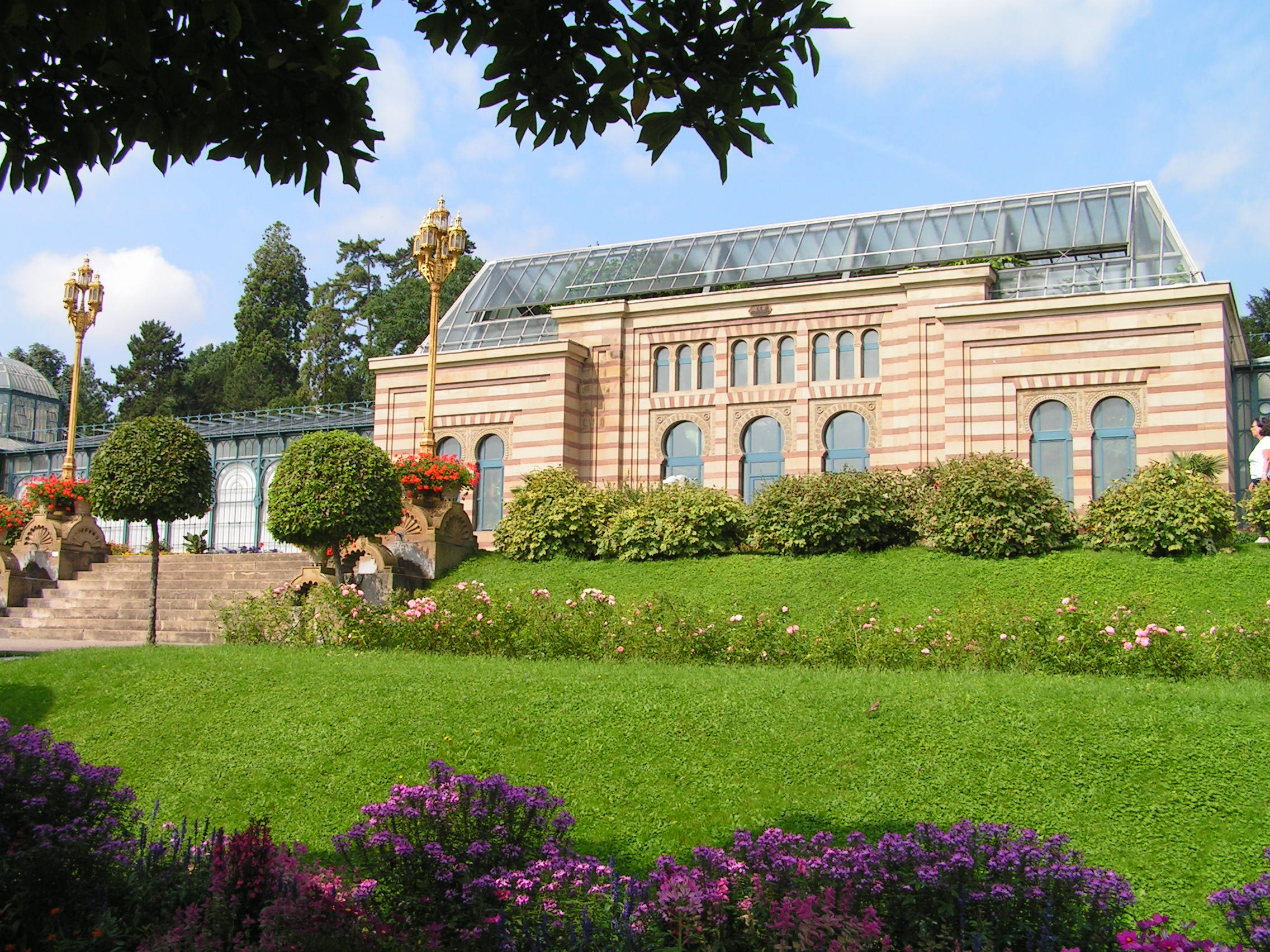
The large greenhouse at Wilhelma

== See also ==
- List of botanical gardens in Germany
