= Angèle Albrecht =

German ballet dancer

Angèle Albrecht (12 December 1942 (Note: According to the birth certificate entry in the register of births, marriages and deaths of the Freiburg im Breisgau registry office dated 15 December 1942; also found in Niehaus 1972, p. 135 bzw. 2nd ed. 1978, p. 94.; Reclam's Ballet Encyclopaedia erroneously states 16 November.) – 1 August 2000) was a German ballerina.

== Life and career ==
Born in Freiburg im Breisgau, Albrecht was the daughter of the Munich painter and stage designer Elmar Albrecht. After training with Lula von Sachnowsky and at the Royal Ballet School in London, she had engagements at the Mannheim National Theatre (1960/61) and at the Hamburg State Opera (1961–1967), where she was discovered as a "great ballerina" under George Balanchine. From 1967 she was a solo dancer in the ballet du XXième siècle by Maurice Béjart in Brussels for many years, where she was successful in Bhakti, Boléro and The Rite of Spring, among others. Guest tours took her to Berlin and Venice (1964), Spain (1965), Munich (1966) and Zurich (1967) with the ballet of the Hamburg State Opera, and to Denmark, Germany, France, Italy, Canada, Cuba, Luxembourg, Mexico, the Netherlands, Poland and Portugal with the "ballet du XXième siècle" among others.

In 1979, she retired from the stage and founded a ballet school in Brussels, which she gave up in the mid-1980s. She then taught in Munich, among others in the Dance Project and in the Roleff-King Ballet School. She had been married since 1969 to the (exiled) Polish concert pianist and composer Piotr Lachert (later divorced), who dedicated the ballet Angelica to her in 1972. Her son Tigran Albrecht is the offspring of her relationship with the choreographer Lorca Massine, the eldest son of Léonide Massine.

Albrecht died in Munich at the age of 57. Her estate is located in the Deutsches Tanzarchiv Köln.

== Repertoire ==
- Calliope in Apollon Musagète (George Balanchine) – Hamburg 1962.
- Walzer in Les Sylphides (Michel Fokine) – Hamburg 1962.
- Cholerikerin in Die Vier Temperamente (George Balanchine) – Hamburg 1963.
- Die Nacht in Orpheus und Eurydike (George Balanchine) – Hamburg 1963.
- Ariadne in Bacchus und Ariadne (George Skibine) – Wuppertal 1964.
- Beide Hauptrollen in Concerto barocco (George Balanchine) – Hamburg 1966.
- Hauptrolle in Symphony in C (George Balanchine) – Hamburg 1966.
- Carmen in Carmen (Roland Petit) – Hamburg 1967.
- Anna II in Die Sieben Todsünden (Dragutin Boldin) – Lübeck 1967.
- Die Auserwählte in Sacre du Printemps (Maurice Béjart) – Brüssel 1967.
- Klassische Partie in Messe pour le temps présent (Maurice Béjart) – Avignon 1967.
- Fliederfee in Ni fleurs ni couronnes (Maurice Béjart) – Grenoble 1968.
- La Femme in Baudelaire (Maurice Béjart) – Brüssel 1968.
- Königin Mab in Romeo et Juliette (Maurice Béjart) – Brüssel 1968.
- Shakti in Bhakti (Maurice Béjart) – Avignon 1968.
- Yolande in Les 4 Fils Aymon (Léonide Massine/Paolo Bortoluzzi/Maurice Béjart) – Avignon 1969.
- Elle in Les Vainqueurs (Maurice Béjart) – Brüssel 1969.

== Reception ==
- Wilfried Hofman: "Angele Albrecht is a stroke of luck: she is an entirely original dancing talent, a woman of high, exotic and yet classical beauty and at the same time a modest, uncorruptible girl".
- Malve Gradinger: "a technically highly brilliant interpreter with a strong personality".
