= Wilhelma-Theater =

Theatre in Stuttgart, Germany

Coordinates: 48°48′19″N 9°12′34″E

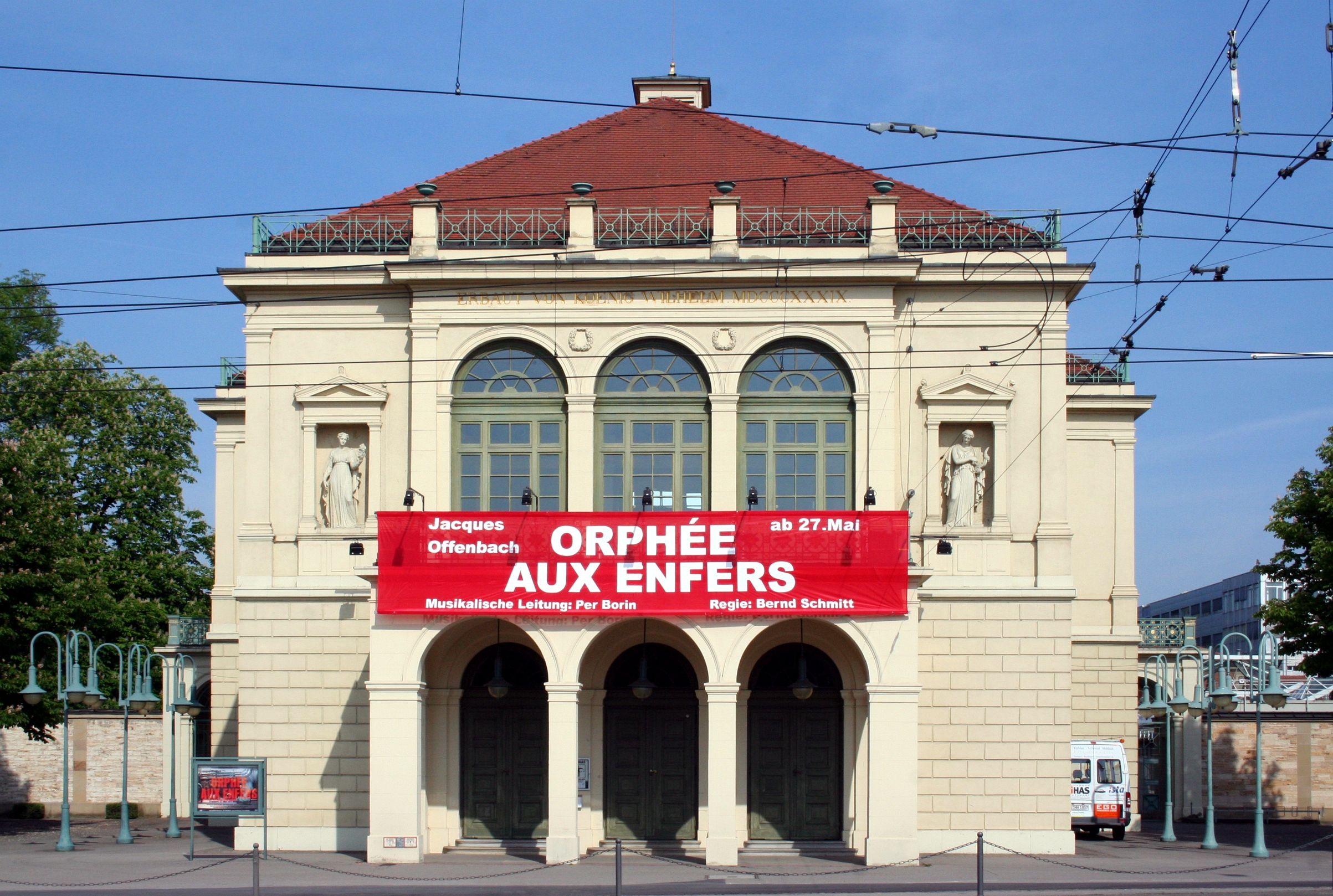
Wilhelma-Theater

Wilhelma-Theater is a theatre in Stuttgart, Baden-Württemberg, Germany.
